= Bruno Héroux =

German painter and graphic artist

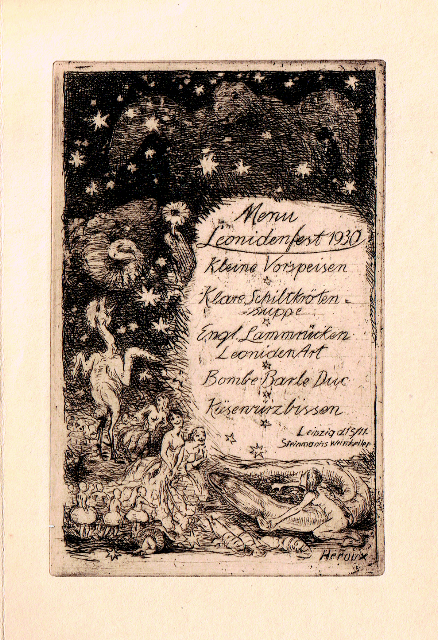
Bruno Héroux: Menu for the Leonid Festival 1930

Louis Carl Bruno Héroux (20 December 1868 – 14 February 1944) was a German painter, graphic and typography and exlibris artist.

== Life ==
Héroux came from a Huguenot family on his father's side family. He was born in Leipzig as the son of the engraver Louis Héroux and his wife Minna, née Zimmermann. He received his artistic training from 1886 to 1892 at the Hochschule für Grafik und Buchkunst Leipzig, where he devoted himself in particular to the study of xylography. The invention of the raster cliché rendered his original wish to work as a wood engraver futile. After a temporary job in the commercial sector, he first earned his living as an illustrator for fashion magazines and humorous magazines.

From 1900, he worked as a freelance graphic artist and was already represented with three works at the International art exhibitions in Dresden the following year. In particular, his etched nude ex libris and the use of the special graphic form of Remarquendrucke contributed to his popularity and reputation. As early as 1903, he was appointed as a teacher at the Royal Academy of Graphic Arts in Leipzig. In 1908, he was awarded the title professor. From 1900 to 1910, he regularly exhibited his paintings and prints at the Salon des Artistes Français in Paris.

In 1910, he compiled his first 200 graphic works in a catalogue raisonné. The self-published catalogue was published in a one-time edition of 500 copies, 100 of which were provided as a special edition with an etching and the signature of the artist. The successful draughtsman, who was appreciated and supported by contemporaries such as Max Klinger, was extremely productive. Over a period of eight years, for example, he produced 600 illustrations for the three-volume Handatlas of Human Anatomy by the physician Werner Spalteholz (1861-1940), published in Leipzig in 1913, which are regarded as masterpieces of anatomical drawing. Within two years he had also created the illustrations for the Atlas of the Anatomy of the Horse, which was published from 1901. In addition, he published several portfolios with drawings he had made on his travels through Italy and Russia. In 1913, he was the responsible artistic director of the art volume Das Völkerschlachtdenkmal (Weiheschrift 1813-1913), which contained, among other things, his portraits of the mayors of Leipzig Otto Georgi, Rudolf Dittrich and Carl Bruno Tröndlin.

For many years, Héroux was the chairman of the Leipzig chapter of the Allgemeine Deutsche Kunstgenossenschaft and an honorary member of the Leipziger Künstlerverein. He was also a member of the Leipzig artists' association Leoniden, founded by Edwin Bormann, Georg Bötticher and Arthur von Oettingen, for which he produced numerous graphic works.

Shortly after a large part of his printing plates were destroyed by the Air Raids on Leipzig on 4 December 1943, the artist died of a severe internal ailment. His ashes were quietly interred.

Héroux, whose household had been run by his half-sister Aurelie Geyer since his mother's death, was from the beginning of the 1920s with Melitta Winkler, married to a teacher for rhythmic education trained at the Mary Wigman School. His flat and studio were initially located at Johannisallee 11, and from 1913 he occupied the 4th floor of the Jugendstil apartment building at Scharnhorststraße 2 in Leipzig, which was built according to plans by Georg Wünschmann and artistically decorated by Héroux. He also owned the watermill in Machern, which he liked to use as a summer country house.

== Obituary ==
On 14 February, Prof. Bruno Héroux, the widely known Leipzig graphic artist who celebrated his 75th birthday only on 20 December last year, died in a Leipzig hospital, where he was seeking healing from a serious internal illness. Since his birth, Bruno Héroux has been closely associated with the imperial trade fair city, where he developed his pencil art and thus significantly promoted Leipzig's fame as one of the focal points of graphic work. His main significance was as an etcher. His plates, which he produced with the utmost technical subtlety, are unforgotten. On some of them he pondered the deepest secrets of life, on others he gave intoxicating expression to his joy of existence. Like Max Klinger, he often compiled such etchings in cycles. He was only just able to complete a series of dances of death before his death. With Bruno Héroux, whose collective exhibition in Chemnitz we were able to report on only recently, the Leipzig State Academy for Graphic Arts and Book Trade has also lost one of its best artists. He taught at this institute for 36 years. H.'s last days were darkened by the pain of seeing a large part of his plates destroyed during the terrorist attack on Leipzig.

— L. Sch.: Prof. Bruno Héroux died. In Neue Leipziger Tageszeitung. No. 47, 17 February 1944, p. 3.

== Honours ==
- 1906: Mention honorable, Paris
- 1910: Austrian Staatsmedaille in Silber für Kunst und Wissenschaft, Salzburg
- 1931: Ehrenmitgliedschaft Deutscher Exlibris Verein
- Ehrenmitglied Leipziger Künstlerverein
- Albert Order, Ritterkreuz I. Klasse

== Memberships ==
- Gesellschaft der Bibliophilen Leipzig
- Allgemeine Deutsche Kunstgenossenschaft
- Leipziger Künstlerverein
- Verband deutscher Illustratoren
- Deutscher Buchgewerbeverein
- Deutscher Exlibris Verein
- Leoniden

== Work (selection) ==
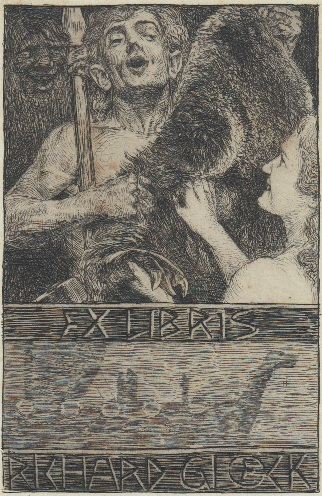
Exlibris for the fur trader Richard Gloeck (1910)

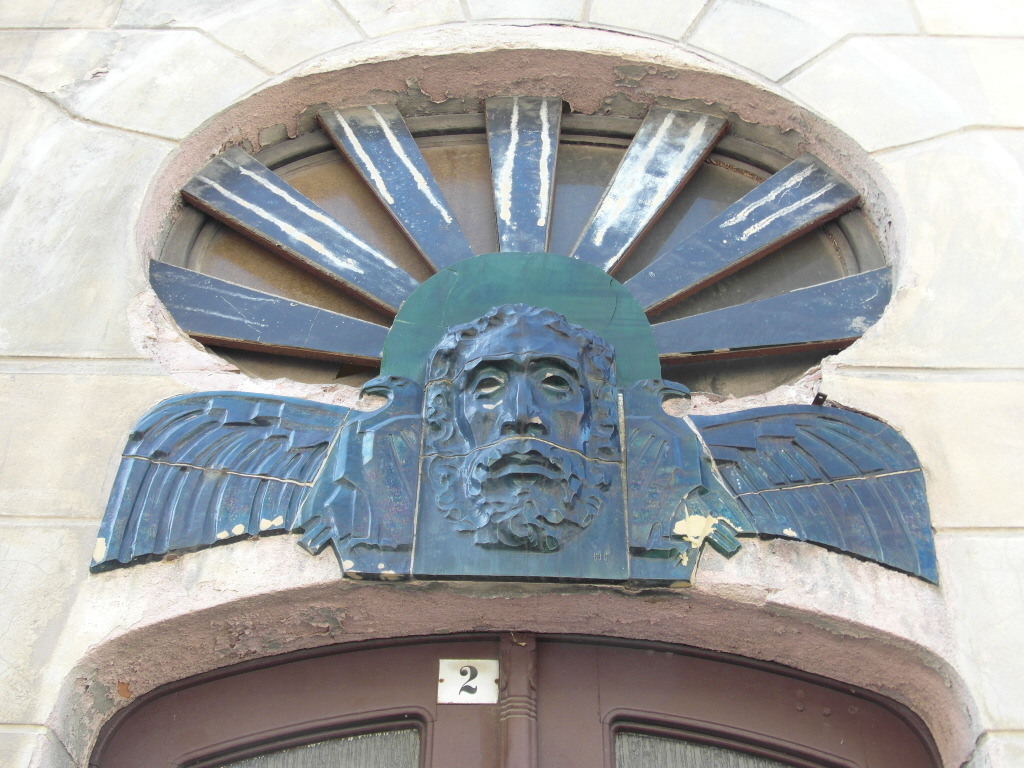
Signierte overdoor above the entrance to the residential and studio house Scharnhorststraße 2

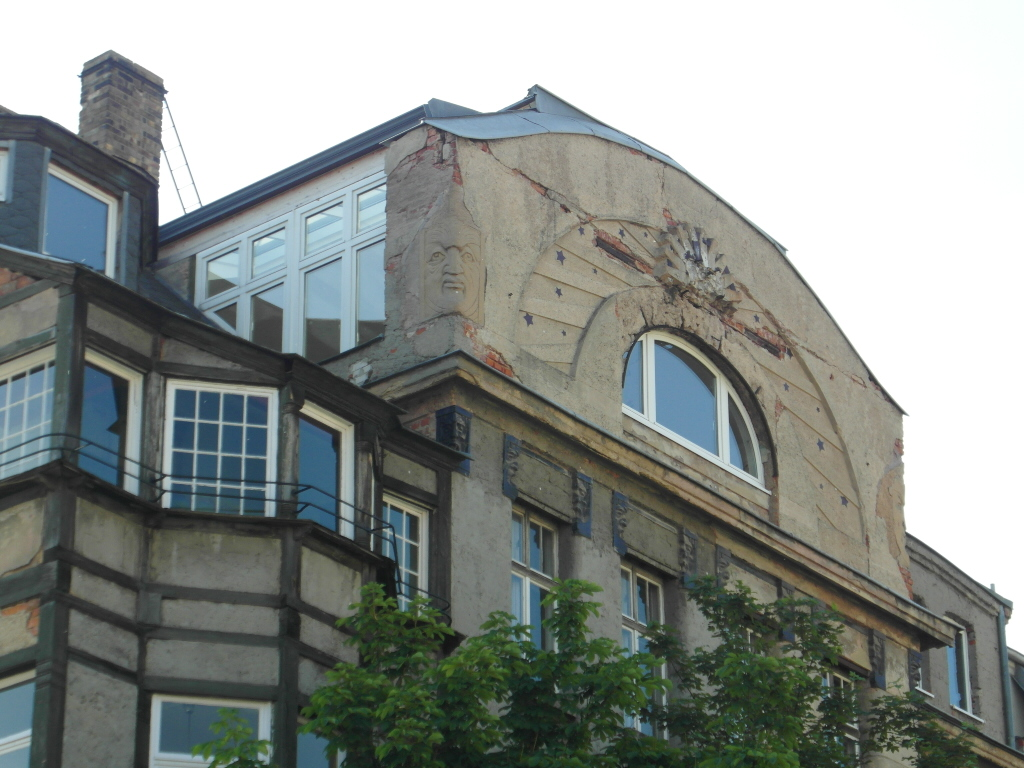
Das Atelier von Bruno Héroux mit dem von ihm entworfenen Fassadenschmuck

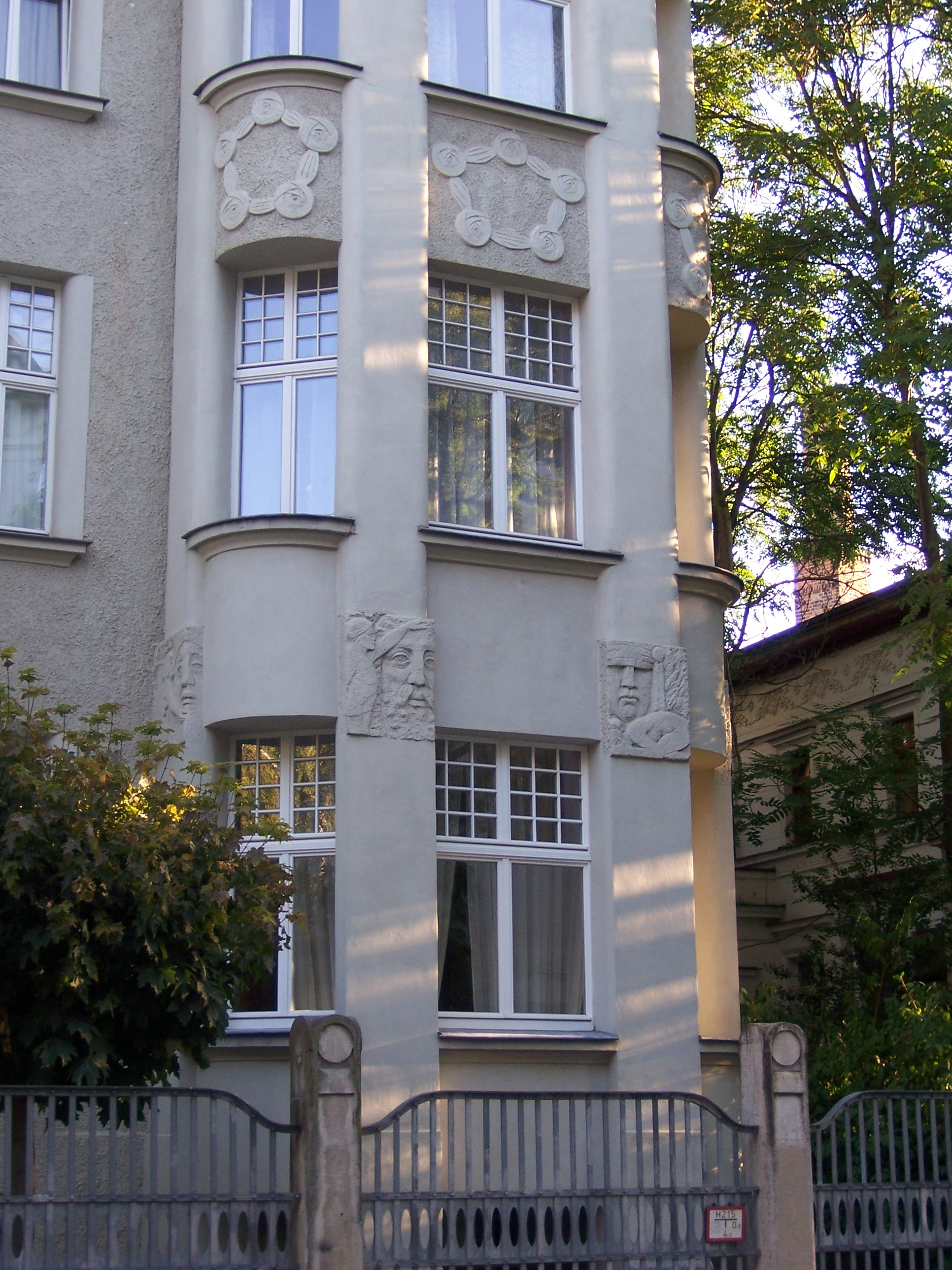
Façade decoration of Chopinstraße apartment building 11a

=== Publications ===
- Reinhold Schmaltz: Atlas der Anatomie des Pferdes. with drawings by Bruno Héroux et al., Schoetz, Berlin 1901ff.
- Ernst Kießling (Verf.), Bruno Héroux (Ill.): Festschrift zum 50jährigen Bestehen des Leipziger Künstlervereins. Breitkopf & Härtel, Leipzig 1908.
- Ernst Kroker, Julius Klinkhardt, Bruno Héroux (Buchschmuck und Orig.-Lithogr.), Carl Weidemeyer (Gestalter): Leipzig. Klinkhardt, Leipzig 1908.
- Malerische Eindrücke einer Reise von Leipzig nach Oberitalien. 36 Skizzen eines deutschen Steinzeichners. Klinckhardt, Leipzig 1910.
- Verzeichnis der graphischen Arbeiten von 1900 bis 1910, umfassend die Blätter 1 bis 200. Leipzig 1910.
- Malerische Eindrücke einer Reise durch Rußland. 42 Steinzeichnungen nach der Natur. Leipzig 1911.
- Alfred Spitzner (Bearb.), Bruno Héroux (Ill.): Deutschlands Denkmal der Völkerschlacht. Das Ehrenmal seiner Befreiung und nationalen Wiedergeburt: 1813, 1913. Weiheschrift des Deutschen Patriotenbundes. Breitkopf & Härtel, Leipzig 1913.
- Deutschlands Freiheitsdom : Gedenkblatt zur Weihe des Völkerschlachtdenkmals. In the Leipziger Neueste Nachrichten 18 October 1913, Edgar Herfurth, Leipzig 1913.
- Werner Spalteholz, Wilhelm His (collaborator.), Bruno Héroux (Ill.): Handatlas der Anatomie des Menschen. Hirzel, Leipzig 1913.
- Egbert Delpy, Bruno Héroux (Ill.): Gedenkblatt zu Bismarcks 100. Geburtstag. Sonderbeilage. the Leipziger Neuesten Nachrichten, 1 April 1915, Herfurth, Leipzig 1915.
- with Richard Braungart, Arthur Liebsch: 101 Exlibris. Abgeschlossen den 1. April 1917. Brandstetter, Leipzig 1917.
- with Egbert Delpy: Bruno Héroux. Sein graphisches Werk bis op. 501. Bong, Berlin 1922.
- Aus den Tänzen von Melitta Héroux. Brandstetter, Leipzig o. J.
- Schwänke vom Nil. B. D. Fellah. Den Leoniden zum Jahresfeste gewidmet. Leipzig 1927.
- Höhen und Tiefen. Den Teilnehmern am Leonidenfest 1930 gewidmet. Leipzig 1930.
- Schmackhaftes im Kunstgewand und Besinnliches aus meinem Garten. Für die Leoniden zum Jahresfest 1933 gedruckt. Leipzig 1933.
- Allerlei Besinnliches aus Garten, Wald und Feld. Zum Leonidenfest 1935 zu Leipzig gedruckt. Leipzig 1935.
- Der Mensch. Anatomie für Künstler. Seemann, Leipzig 1938.
- Chronik der Allgemeinen Deutschen Kunstgenossenschaft und Festschrift der Ortsgruppe Leipzig 1860-1935, jetzt Leipziger Künstlergenossenschaft. Leipzig 1935.
- Chronik der Allgemeinen Deutschen Kunstgenossenschaft und Festschrift der Ortsgruppe Leipzig 1860-1935, jetzt Leipziger Künstlergenossenschaft, Schlußkapitel hrsg. aus Anlaß ihrer Auflösung Mai 1939. Leipzig 1939.
- Ein Totentanz. 12 Stichradierungen und Sinnsprüche 1939–1943. Selbstdruck, Leipzig 1943.
