= Raphael of Cats =

Raphael of Cats can refer to any one of three artists noted for their portraits of cats:

- Gottfried Mind (1768–1814), Swiss artist who specialized in drawing
- Fedor Flinzer (1832–1911), German author, educator and illustrator
- Sal Meijer (1877–1965), Dutch painter

== See also ==
- Raphael
