= Fedor Flinzer =

German painter

Fedor Alexis Flinzer
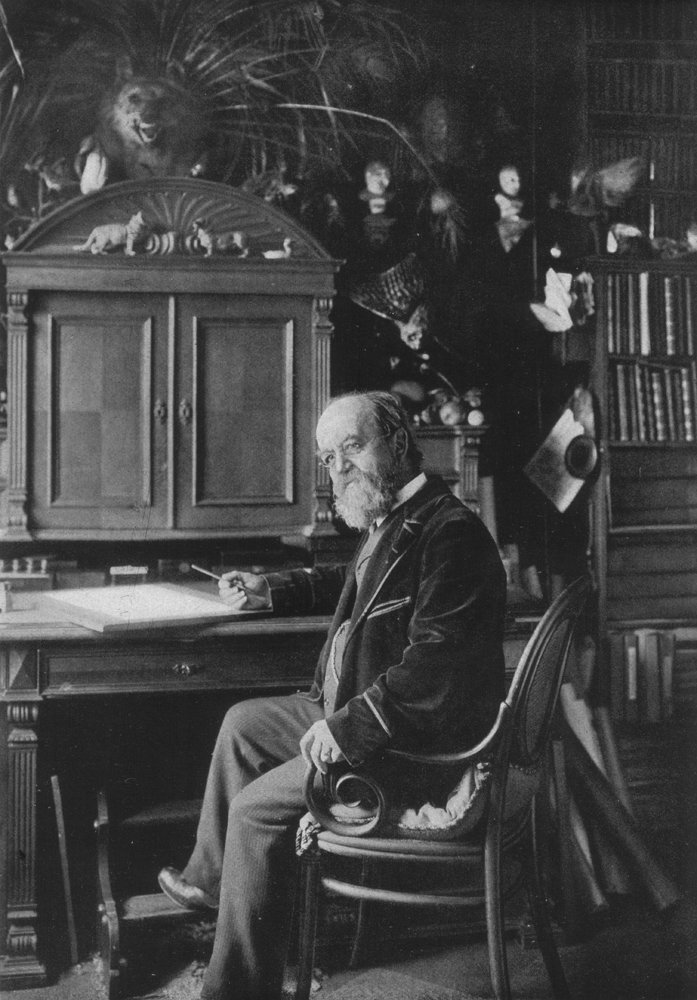
- Born: April 4, 1832; Reichenbach im Vogtland
- Died: June 14, 1911 (aged 79); Leipzig
- Known for: Animal illustrations; children's book illustrations; art education
- Movement: Biedermeier, Romanticism, Historicism, Art Nouveau
- Spouse: Marie Wolfram

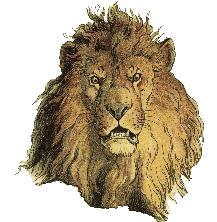
Detail from the picture book König Nobel (Breslau 1886) by Fedor Flinzer

Fedor Alexis Flinzer (4 April 1832 in Reichenbach im Vogtland – 14 June 1911 in Leipzig) was an author, educator and one of the greatest German illustrators of the Gründerzeit, who was called Raphael of Cats.

== Early life ==
Since 1849 Flinzer visited the Dresden Academy of Fine Arts. His teachers were i.a. Adrian Ludwig Richter and Julius Schnorr von Carolsfeld. From 1859 he held a position as an art teacher in Chemnitz, where he also was one of the founders of the Kunsthütte (art cabin) and a member of the Masonic Lodge Zur Harmonie (to the harmony). In 1862 Flinzer married Marie Wolfram, a niece of the composer Richard Wagner.

== Art teacher and municipal inspector of art education in Leipzig ==
1876 – shortly after he took office as a municipal inspector of art education and after the beginning of his work as an art teacher at the Petrischule in Leipzig – Flinzer summarized his accumulated practical knowledge in his textbook called Lehrbuch des Zeichenunterrichts (Bielefeld/Leipzig 1876). This work made him known also in other European countries and in America. Because of his textbook Flinzer was referred as a forerunner of the so-called Kunsterziehungsbewegung (Art education movement), part of the Progressive education movement. Flinzer joined issues with the leading representatives of this movement. In consequence of the Kunsterziehungsbewegung his influence waned.

== Artist ==
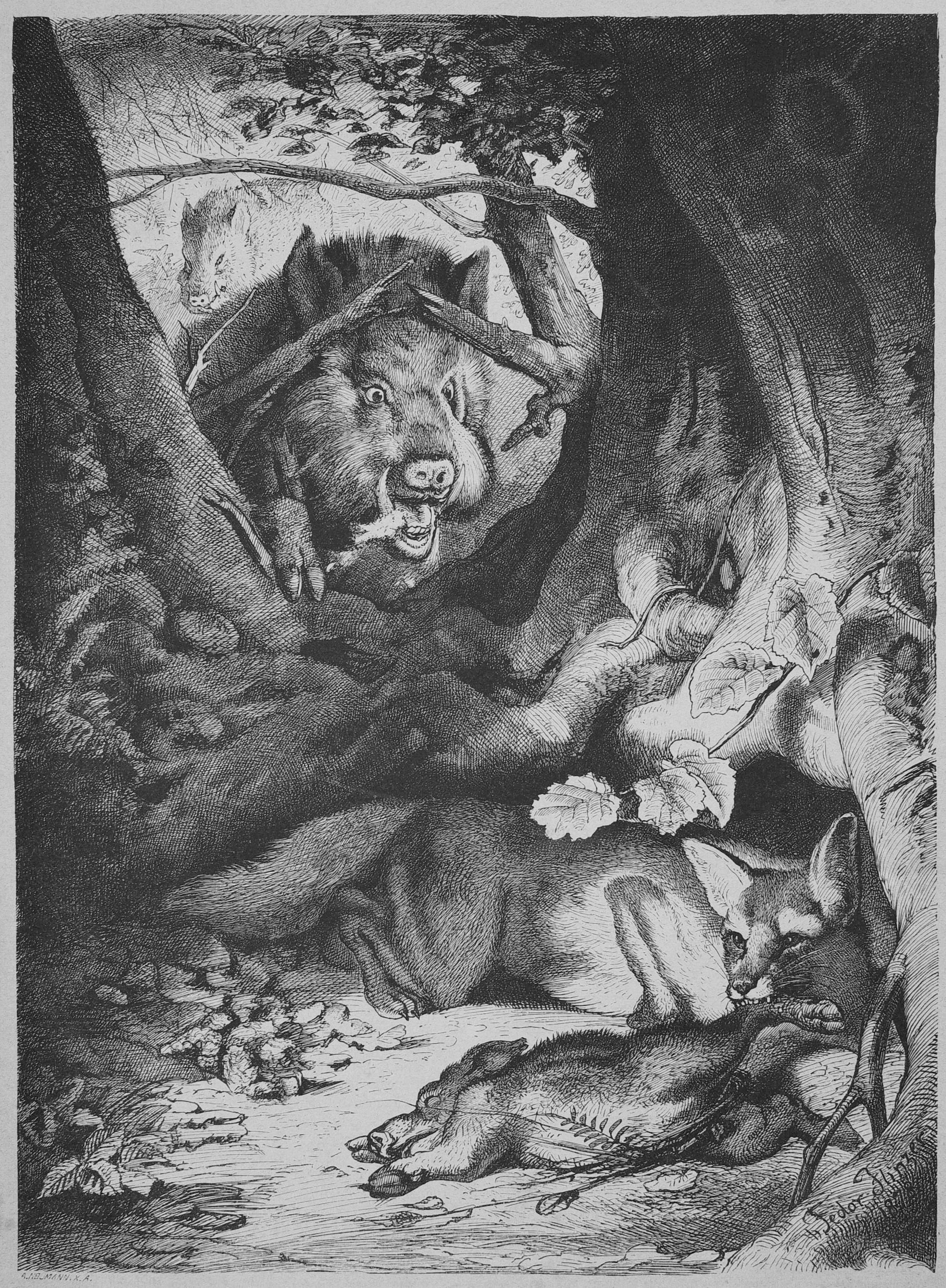
Angry boar by Fedor Flinzer

Rooted in the art of Biedermeier and Romanticism, Flinzer later created works with clear traces of Historicism and with hints of Art Nouveau. His artistic preference was for the animal world, his passion were cats. This was the reason for his nicknames Katzen-Flinzer (Cat Flinzer) or Saxon Raphael of Cats. Characteristic for Flinzer's art is the humanized and satirical depiction of animals, partly in the style of Wilhelm von Kaulbach and Grandville.

In Flinzer's early years oil paintings and frescos emerged such as for the Webschule (weaving school) in Chemnitz. Examples for his commercial art work are the Cat, a world-famous brand for Hoffmann's Stärkefabriken in Bad Salzuflen, and designs for toys of the Dresdner Werkstätten. Flinzer also illustrated oval Playing cards. Apart from this the illustrator Flinzer worked for an adult audience, as in the family magazines Die Gartenlaube and Daheim. Over and above, illustrations for hundreds of children, youth and picture books came into being. Flinzer's main work is the picture book König Nobel (1886), a continuation of the famous Reynard the Fox published in collaboration with the German author Julius Lohmeyer (1834–1903). Other writers, with whom Flinzer worked, are Frida Schanz (1859–1944), Victor Blüthgen (1844–1920), Georg Christian Dieffenbach, Johannes Trojan (1837–1915), Edwin Bormann (1851–1912) and Georg Bötticher, the father of Joachim Ringelnatz.

Finally, Flinzer's contributions to the influential youth magazine Deutsche Jugend have to be mentioned; for example, he illustrated the first edition of Theodor Storm's story Lena Wies for this periodical. Further, Flinzer contributed to a well-known British publication for young people called Aunt Judy's Magazine.

Flinzer was a member of the Leipzig artist association Leoniden. Among his pupils were the graphic designer Hans Domizlaff (1892–1971), the landscape painter Arthur Feudel (1857–1929), the sculptor Albrecht Leistner (1887–1950) as well as the artist and KGB agent Gerd Kaden (1891–1990).

== Aftermath ==
Inspired by a picture-book illustration of Flinzer, the Austrian artist Christian Ludwig Attersee created his provocative work Kinderzimmertriptychon (Nursery Triptych; dated 1971). In 1989 Nayland Blake combined a drawing by Flinzer from the Deutsche Jugend (1973, volume 2, page 186) with a phrase he wrote and laid out in type. This work is, without any hint on Flinzer's authorship, in the collection of the San Francisco Museum of Modern Art today.

== Memorial and medal ==
Flinzer's grave was located in the New St. John's Cemetery in Leipzig. In 1914 the sculptor Johannes Hartmann (1869–1952) completed his Fedor Flinzer monument for this grave. The medailleur Adolf Lehnert (1862–1948) designed a medal in Flinzer's honor.

== Works (selection) ==
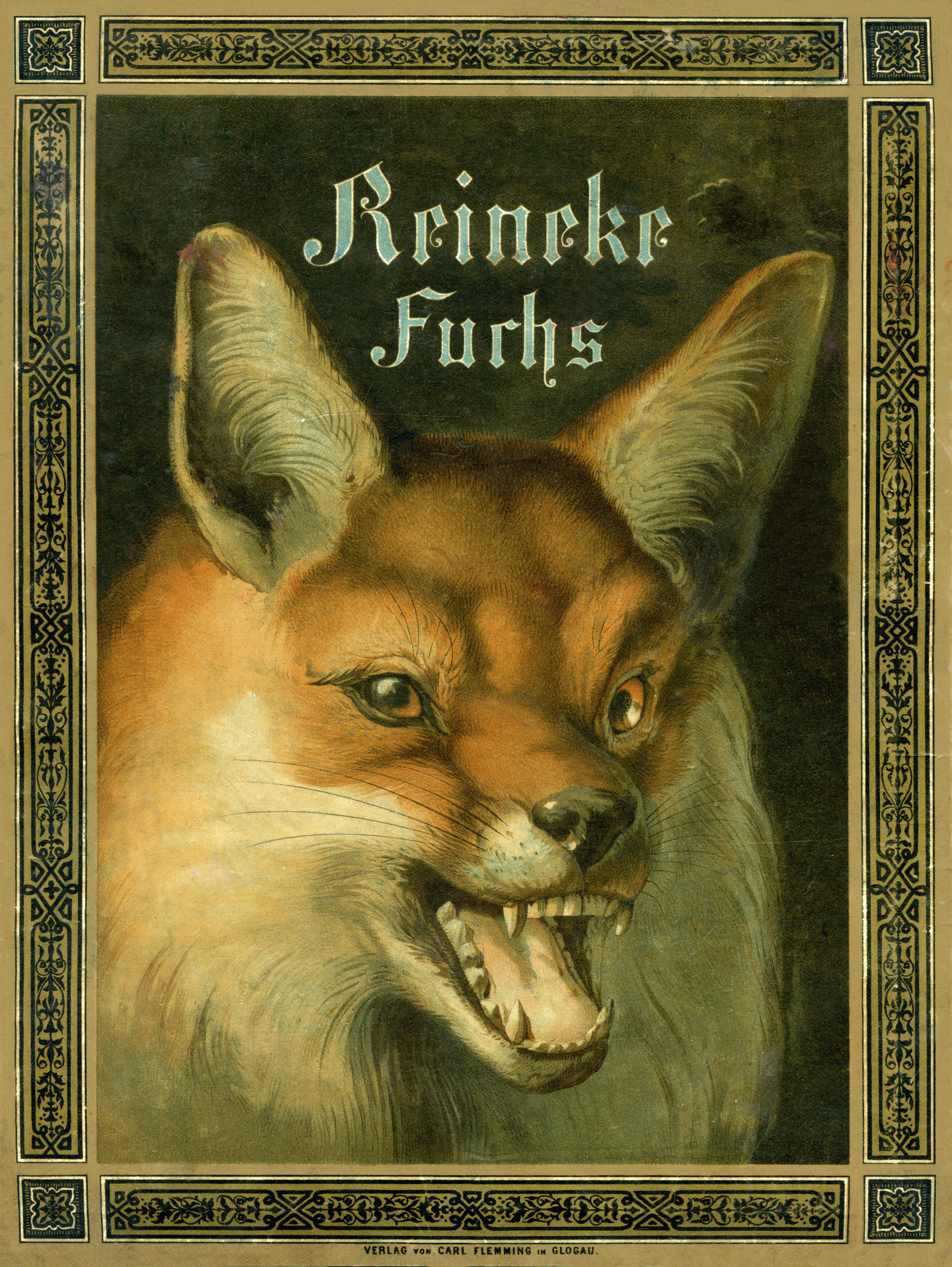
Title page from Flinzer's Reineke Fuchs (Glogau 1881)

"Hoffmann's Katze", a world-famous brand by Fedor Flinzer for Hoffmann's Stärkefabriken

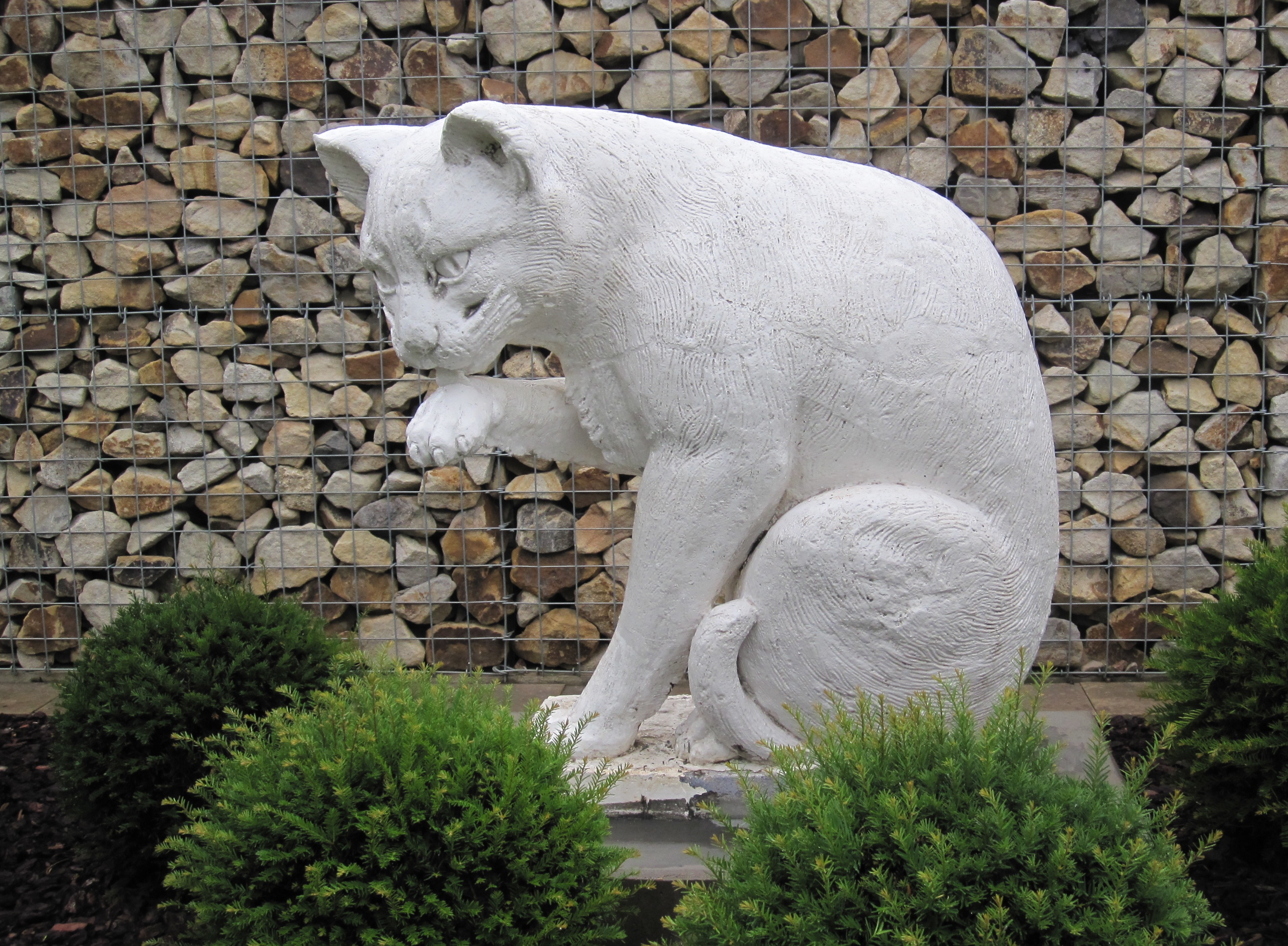
Sculpture based on Flinzer's brand

- Frau Kätzchen, Chemnitz 1870 (with Emma Hilgenfeld)
- Der Froschmäusekrieg [based on the Greek Batrachomyomachia], Frankfurt am Main 1878 (with Victor Blüthgen; modified reprint 1994)
- Reineke Fuchs (Freie Nachdichtung des niederdeutschen Reinke de Vos.), Glogau 1881 (with Julius Lohmeyer and Edwin Bormann)
- Jugendbrunnen, Berlin 1883 (reprint 1990)
- Contribution to The feathers & fur picture book, London & New York 1884
- Poquito á poco, Barcelona 1885 (with Anna Herding)
- Glückliche Kinderzeit, Bremen 1885 (with Georg Christian Dieffenbach; modified reprint 1989)
- By little and little or first English lesson-book for children from five to ten years of age, Breslau 1885 (with A. Herding)
- Nuevas fábulas, Barcelona 1886 (with Felipe Jacinto Sala)
- Tommy Murr's diary, London ca. 1886
- König Nobel, Breslau 1886 (with Julius Lohmeyer; modified reprint 1979)
- Reviews in Jahresberichte über das höhere Schulwesen, Berlin 1886 ff. (editor Conrad Rethwisch)
- Der Thierstruwwelpeter, Breslau 1887 (with Julius Lohmeyer)
- Des Kindes Wunderhorn, Breslau 1889
- Struwwelpeter der Jüngere, Stuttgart 1891 (with Johannes Trojan; English edition: Struwwelpeter junior)
- Eine Tierschule in Bildern, Breslau 1891 (with Victor Blüthgen; modified reprint 1979)
- Wie die Tiere Soldaten werden wollten, Leipzig 1892 (with Georg Bötticher; modified reprint 1979)
- Der Tanz, Leipzig 1893
- Contribution to Juliana Horatia Ewing, Verses for Children and Songs for Music, London 1895

== Exhibitions (selection) ==
- 2003/2004 Troisdorf, Bilderbuchmuseum
- 2004 Dresden, Museum für Sächsische Volkskunst
- 2004 Reichenbach im Vogtland, Neuberin-Museum
- 2004/2005 Bad Pyrmont, Museum im Schloss
- 2005 Bad Salzuflen, Stadt- & Bädermuseum

== Secondary literature (selection) ==
- Enciclopedia Universal Ilutrada Europeo-Americana, Tomo XXIV, Madrid 1924, 83
- Fedor Bochow, Volker Ladenthin, Maria Linsmann: Kinder, Katzen, Kunst. Der Bilderbuchkünstler Fedor Alexis Flinzer (1832–1911). Burg Wissem – Bilderbuchmuseum, Troisdorf 2003, ISBN 3-9809301-0-6
- Fedor Bochow: Flinzer, Fedor Alexis, in: Saur Allgemeines Künstlerlexikon. Die Bildenden Künstler aller Zeiten und Völker, Bd. 41, München/Leipzig 2004, 254–256
- Fedor Bochow: Flinzer, Fedor, in: Sächsische Biografie. Herausgegeben vom Institut für Sächsische Geschichte und Volkskunde, bearb. von Martina Schattkowsky

== See also ==
- List of German painters
