= KattenKabinet =

Art museum in Amsterdam, the Netherlands

Coordinates: 52°21′56″N 4°53′29.5″E

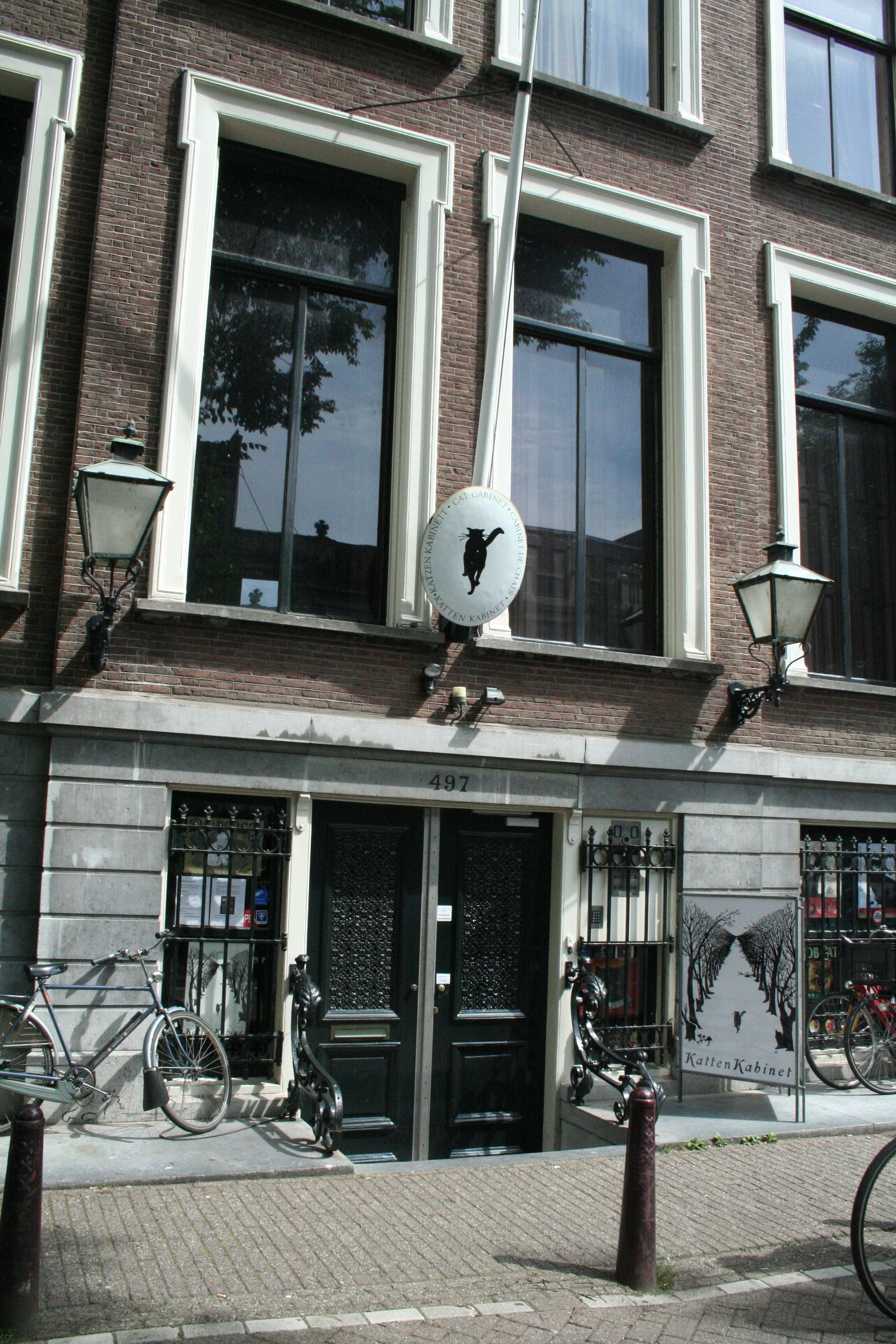
The KattenKabinet in Amsterdam

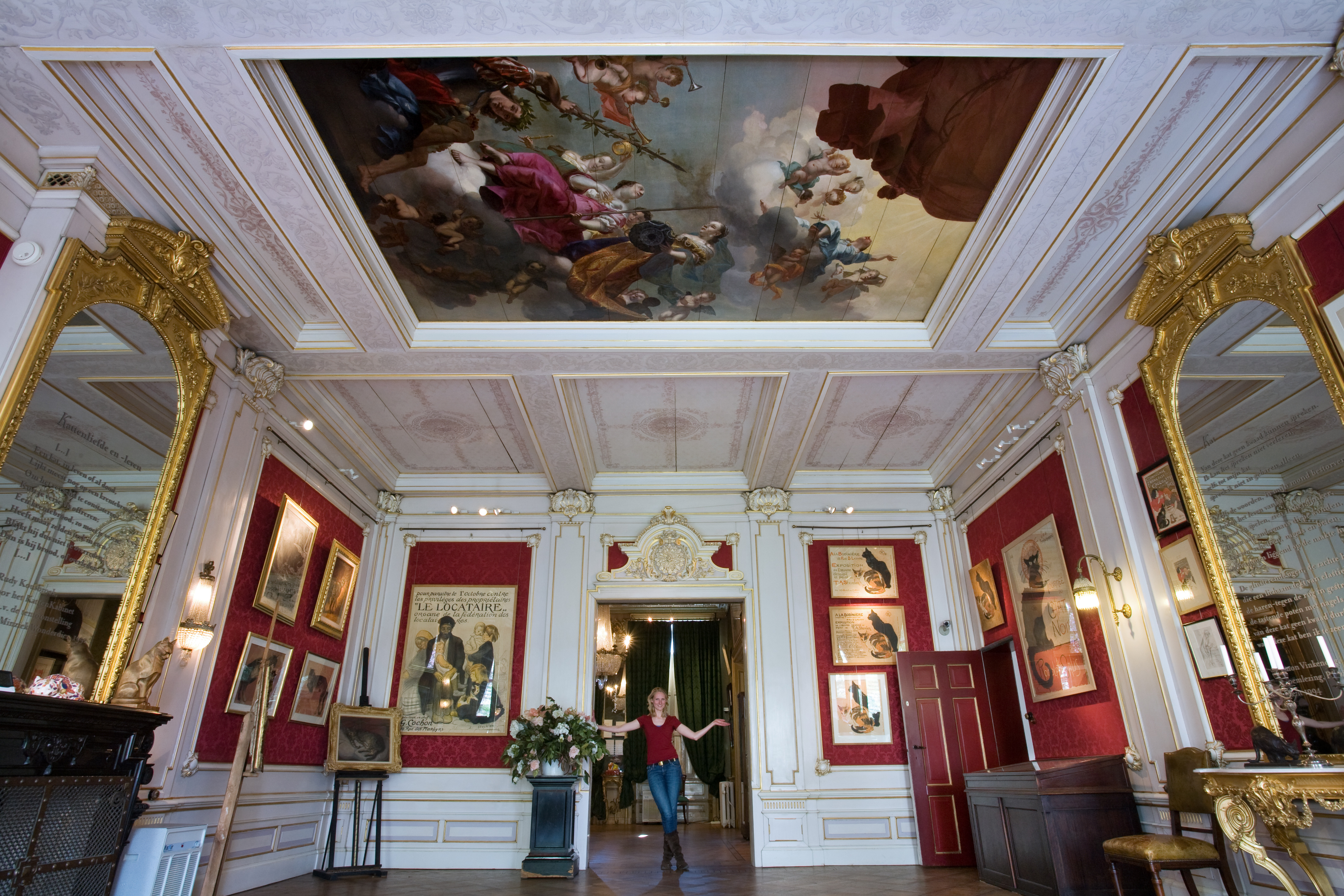
Restored 17th-century ceiling painting

The KattenKabinet ("Cat Cabinet") is an art museum in Amsterdam devoted to works depicting cats. The museum collection includes paintings, drawings, sculptures and other works of art by Pablo Picasso, Rembrandt, Henri de Toulouse-Lautrec, Corneille, Sal Meijer, Théophile Steinlen, Ed van der Elsken and Jože Ciuha, among others.

The museum is housed in a canalside building at Herengracht 497, in the grand Gouden Bocht ("Golden Bend") of this canal. The owner lives on the second floor of the building with his family. There are some cats in the museum as well.

== History ==
The house and the adjacent building at Herengracht 499 were built in 1667 for the patrician brothers Willem and Adriaen van Loon. Through the luck of the draw, Willem was given the house at number 497. Later, the house was inhabited by Amsterdam mayor Jan Calkoen and Amsterdam pensionary Engelbert François van Berckel, among others. John Adams visited Van Berckel at the house during his time as U.S. ambassador to the Dutch republic.

In 1985, the building was restored, and in 1990 the museum was founded by Bob Meijer in memory of his red tomcat John Pierpont Morgan (named after the American banker J. P. Morgan).

The museum served as filming location for Ocean's Twelve in 2004.
