= Raamgracht =

Canal in Amsterdam

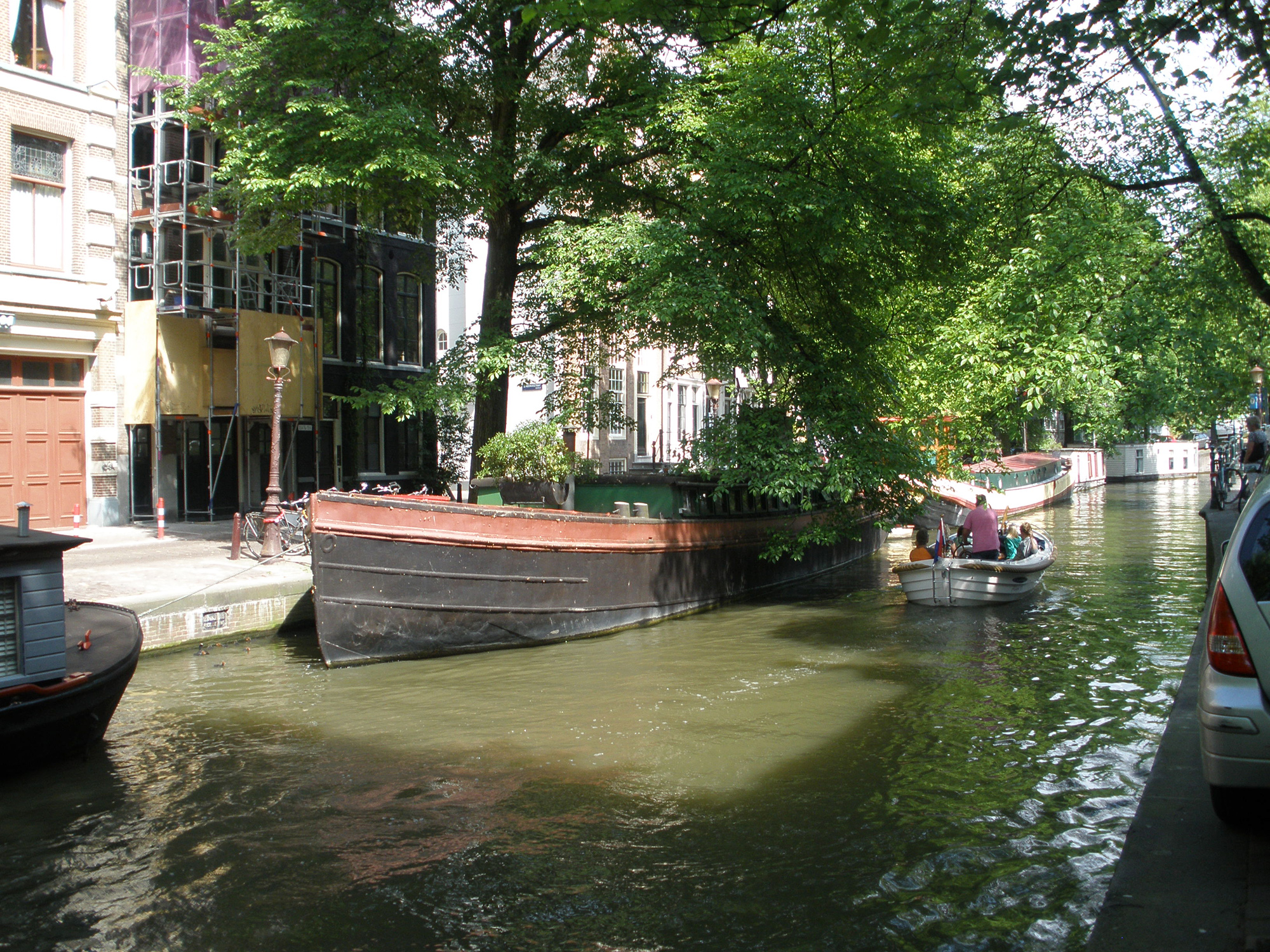
- Raamgracht

- Location within Amsterdam
- Location: Amsterdam
- Postal code: 1011
- Coordinates: 52.369780°N 4.898839°E
- East end: Zwanenburgwal
- To: Kloveniersburgwal

The Raamgracht (Frame Canal) is a canal in central Amsterdam that runs from the Kloveniersburgwal to the Zwanenburgwal. The Groenburgwal, Verversstraat and Zanddwarsstraat lead to the Raamgracht. Bridge 225 over the canal is beside the Kloveniersburgwal, and Theo Boschbrug (bridge 230) over the canal is beside the Zwanenburgwal.

== History ==
The area between the Kloveniersburgwal and the Zwanenburgwal was still "outside the fortress" (outside the city walls) until the late 16th century. It was added to the city in 1593. At that time there were weaving mills in the area, where after washing, carding, spinning, weaving and dying the woolen fabric was stretched on wooden frames (raamen) to dry and stretch. The names Raamgracht, Ververstraat and Staalstraat recall that period. On a map from 1625 by Balthasar Florisz. van Berckenrode the canal is called the "Verwers Graft" (Dyers Canal). It then makes a right angle near the Moddermeule Steech and merges into a wider area that is also called Verwers Graft (now called Zwanenburgwal).

In the 17th century the cloth weavers moved to the then western border of the city, near the Bloemgracht and the Jordaan. The Raamstraat, Raamplein and Raampoort can still be found there.

The Raamgracht is located in the former Jodenbuurt (Jewish quarter) of Amsterdam. During World War II many Jewish residents of Raamgracht were taken to concentration camps and did not survive the war. Afterwards, part of the buildings on the north side of the Raamgracht was demolished for the construction of the Oostlijn metro line. The Pentagon designed by Theo Bosch was then built here.

== Trivia ==
The weekly Vrij Nederland has been established for many years in a monumental building from 1914 on Raamgracht 4, on the corner with the Kloveniersburgwal. The Weekbladpers (publisher of Vrij Nederland and magazines like Opzij and Hollands Diep) is also located at Raamgracht 4. Journalist Igor Cornelissen wrote the book Raamgracht 4 about his time as editor of Vrij Nederland in the 1960s.

Sal Meijer painted the Raamgracht. This painting was purchased by the government in 1957 on the occasion of its 80th birthday.

In the early 1970s, the poet and writer Hugo Claus, together with his then muse, the actress Sylvia Kristel, occupied the Raamgracht 5-7 building.

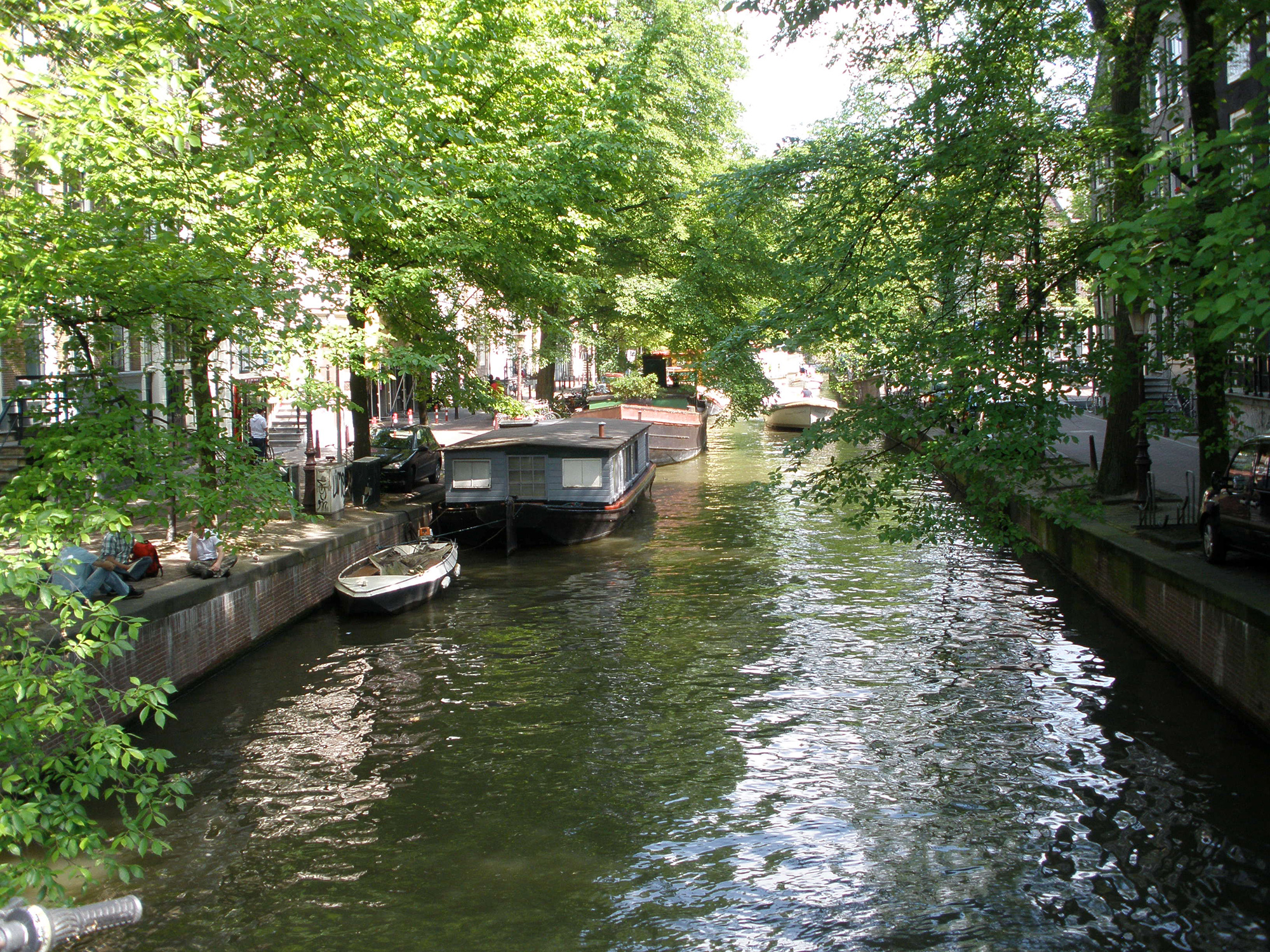
Raamgracht

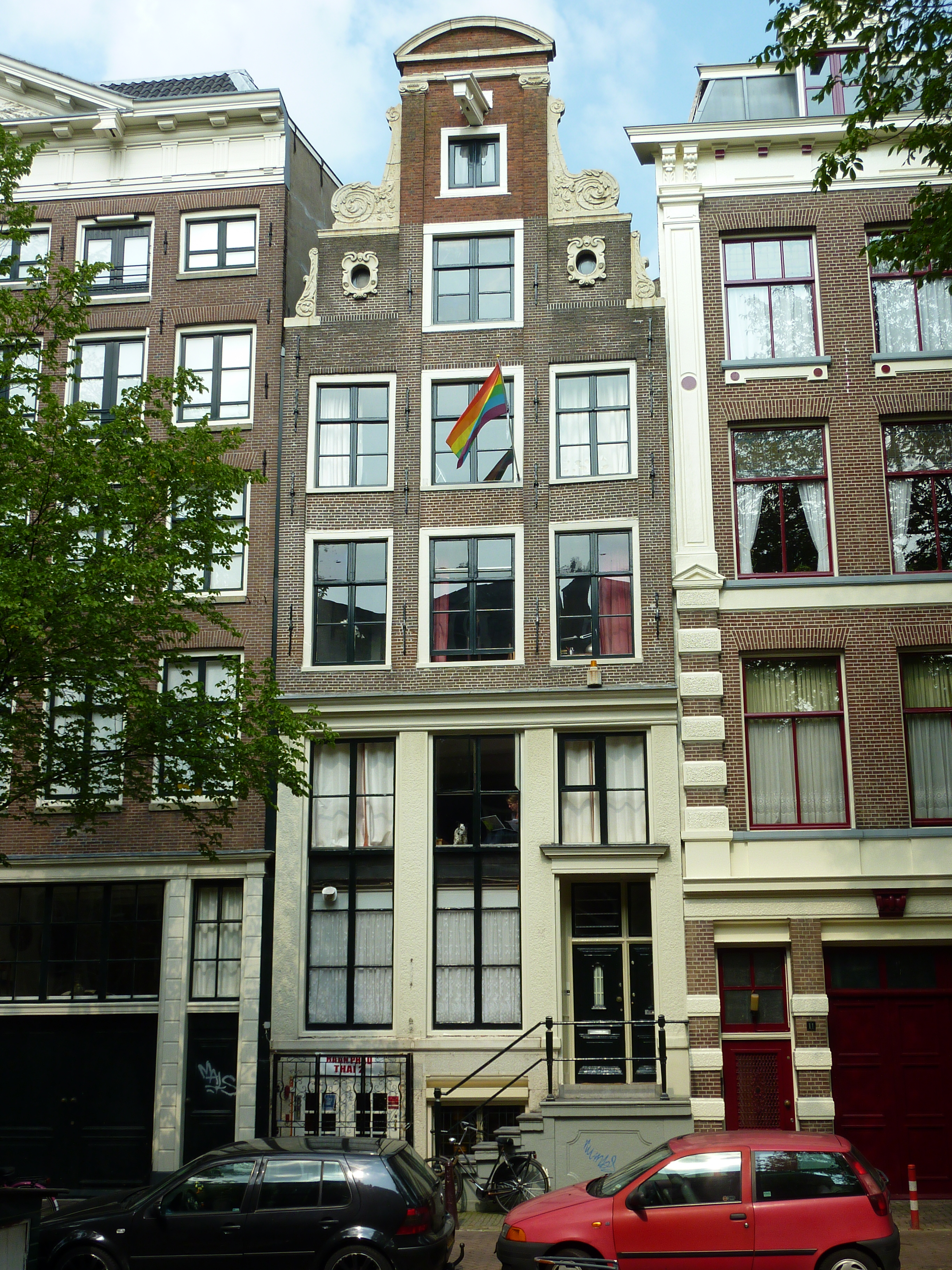
Building on the canal

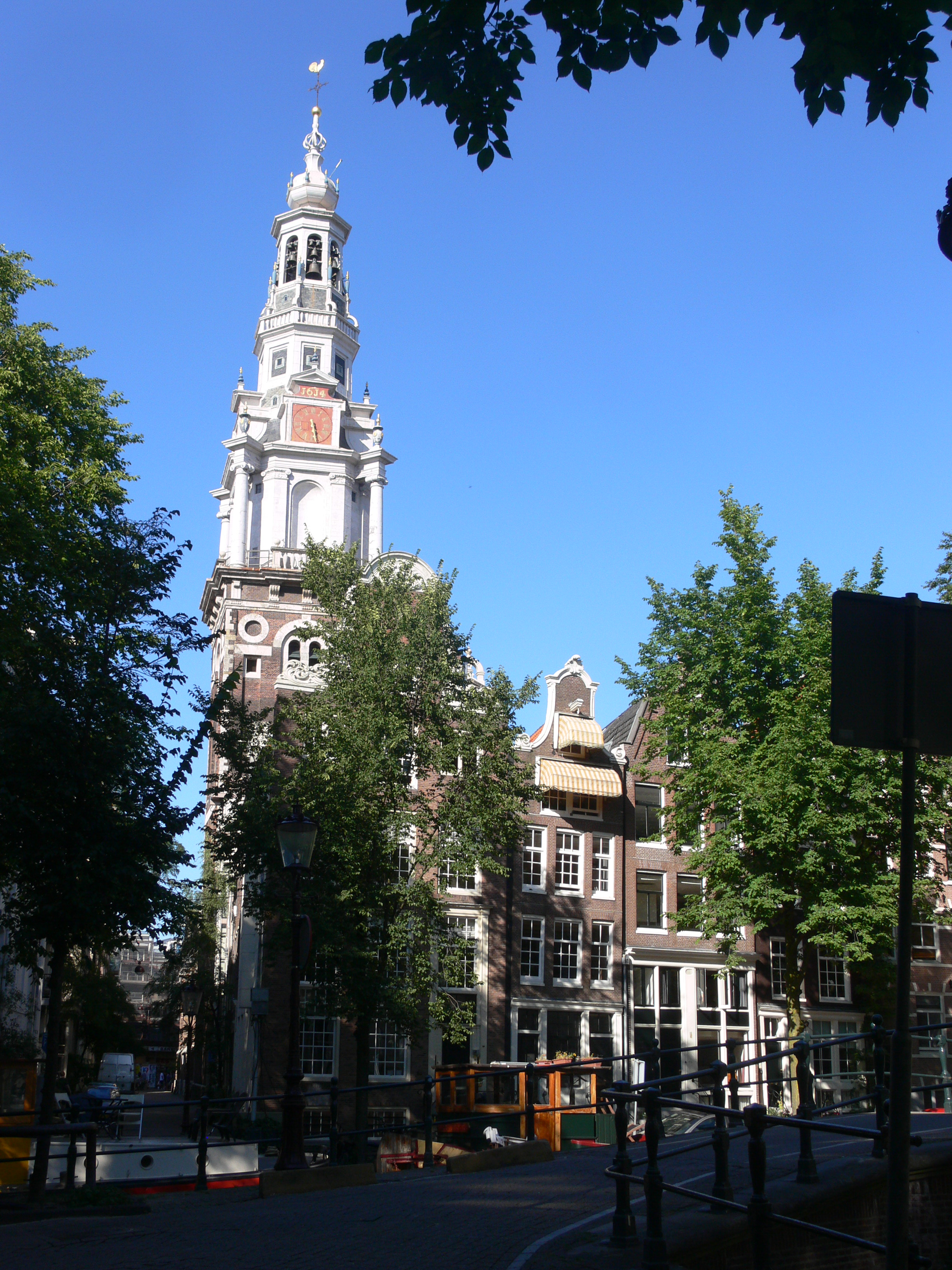
The Raamgracht with the Zuiderkerk in the background

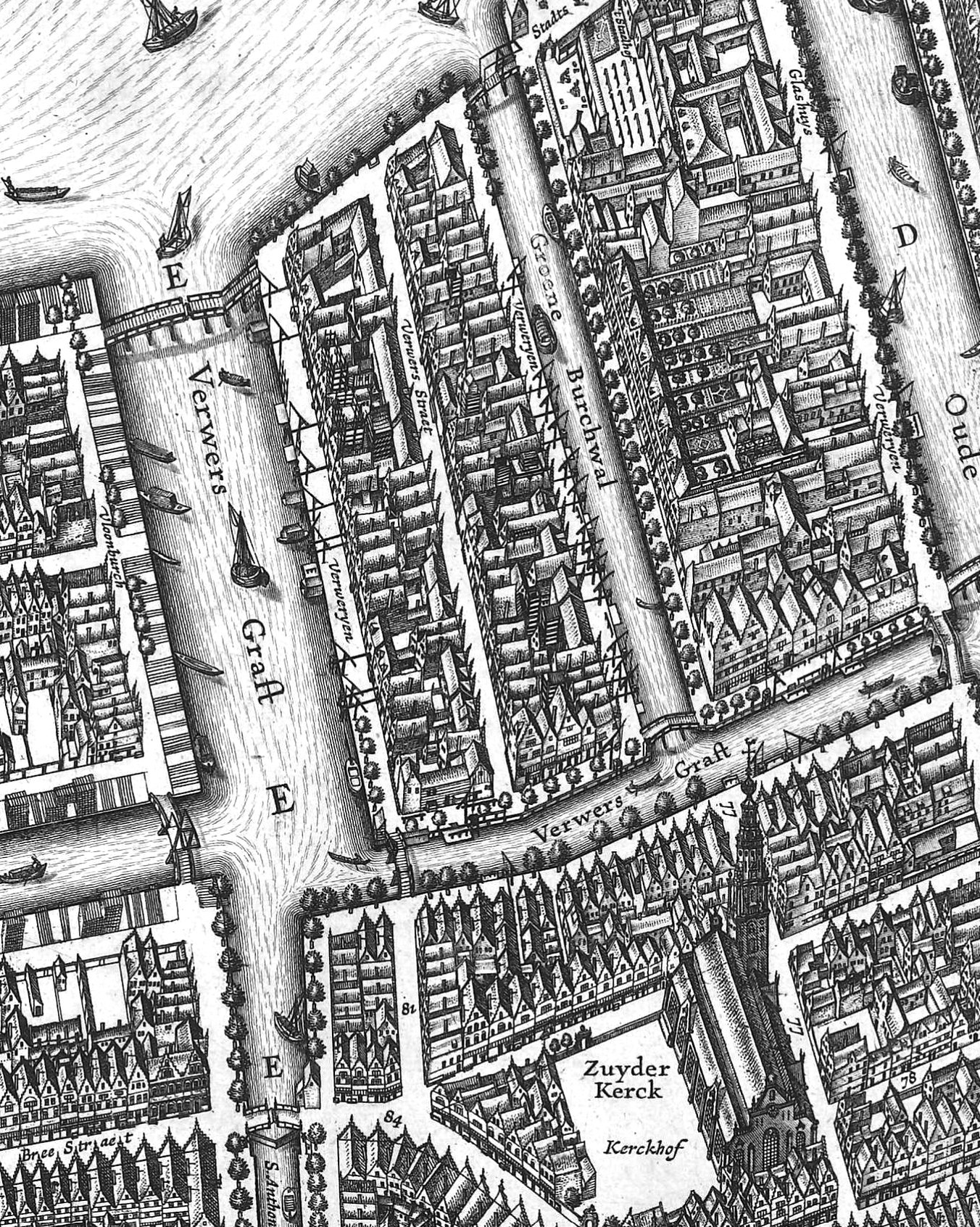
Ververgracht, Groenburgwal and Zuiderkerk (1625) by Balthasar Florisz van Berckenrode

== Raamgracht in other cities ==
There was a Raamgracht in The Hague that was filled in around 1850. There was also a Raamgracht in Haarlem, now the Gedempte Raamgracht.

== See also ==
- Canals of Amsterdam
