= Groenburgwal =

Canal in Amsterdam

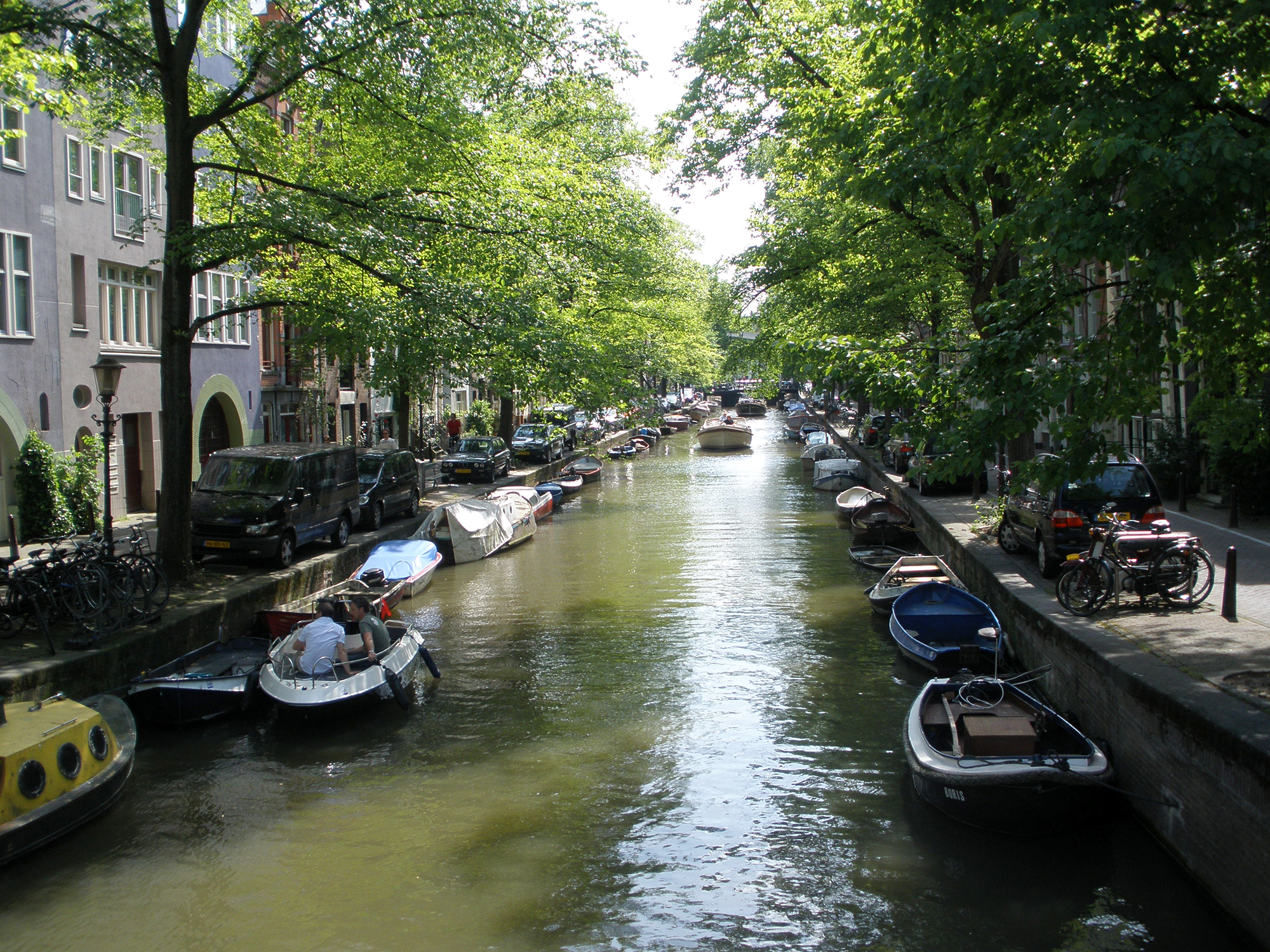
- Groenburgwal

- Location within Amsterdam
- Location: Amsterdam
- Postal code: 1011
- Coordinates: 52.368527°N 4.897915°E
- Northeast end: Raamgracht
- To: Amstel

The Groenburgwal (Dutch pronunciation: [ˈɣrumˌbʏr(ə)xʋɑl]) is a canal in Amsterdam that connects the Raamgracht with the Amstel. The Groenburgwal is parallel to the Kloveniersburgwal and the Zwanenburgwal, in the shadow of the tower of the Zuiderkerk.

== History ==
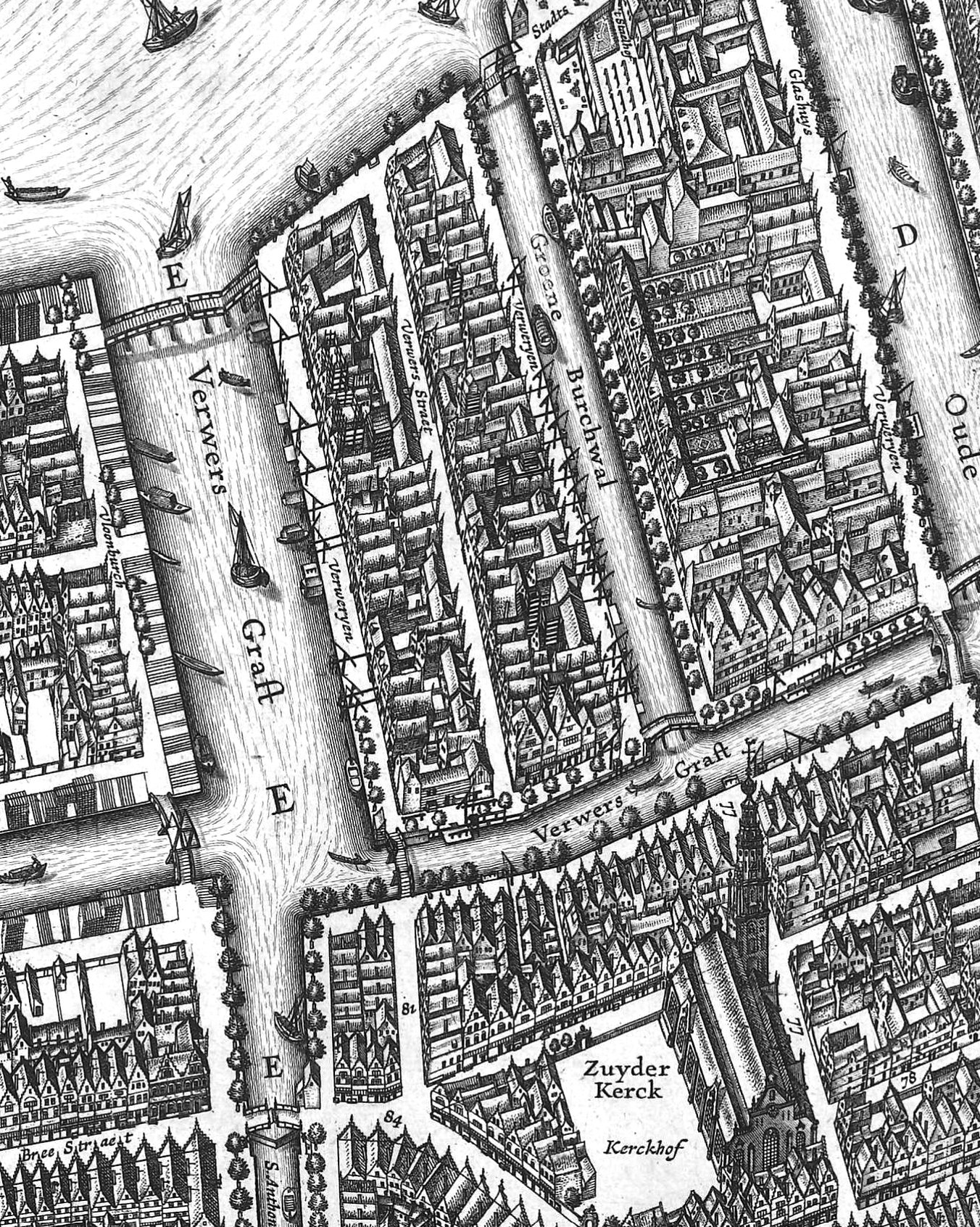
Detail from the map of Amsterdam by Balthasar Florisz van Berckenrode from around the Verversgracht, Groene Burchwal and the Zuyderkerck

The area between the Kloveniersburgwal and the Zwanenburgwal was until late in the 16th century "the site outside the fortress at the Amstel". In 1593 the area was added to the city.

Cloth weavers worked here. The wool was washed, carded and spun, then cloth was woven from it. After fulling and dyeing the cloth was tensioned on wooden frames to dry and stretch. The names of the nearby Raamgracht, the Raamsloot near Rusland, dug in 1537, and the Verversstraat (1593) recall those activities.

In the early 17th century, the Amstel between Kloveniersburgwal and Groenburgwal and a little later the 's Gravelandse Veer, between Groenburgwal and Blauwbrug, was compressed. Around that time the name Groenburgwal was born; green dyers were specially established here.

== Monuments and architecture ==
- The Church of England Christ Church at number 42 is one of the first neo-Gothic churches in the country. In 1829, part of the former Cloth Hall 't Staalhoff was rebuilt in neo-Gothic style for this church.
- Ceiling paintings from 1633 were found on Groenburgwal 61. [1]
- The tile panels on the façade of Groenburgwal 30 state that the St. Vincentius Tusschenschool was located here.
- Over the water of the Groenburgwal is a wooden drawbridge at the Staalstraat: the Staalmeestersbrug (no. 227).
- The 18th-century stone arch bridge over the Groenburgwal on the Raamgracht is bridge no. 226 .
- Groenburgwal 32-34 is the modern wing of a youth hostel, designed by WA Ulrichs and BJF Kamphuis in 1956. (Entrance Kloveniersburgwal 97.)

== Trivia ==
- c. 1874, the impressionist Claude Monet painted the canvas The Zuiderkerk, Amsterdam (Looking up the Groenburgwal). The painting is owned by the Philadelphia Museum of Art.
- In 1987, a part of the Groenburgwal was converted into Rosse Buurt for two days for the recording of a scene from the Amsterdamned film, because it was not allowed to film on the Red Light District.
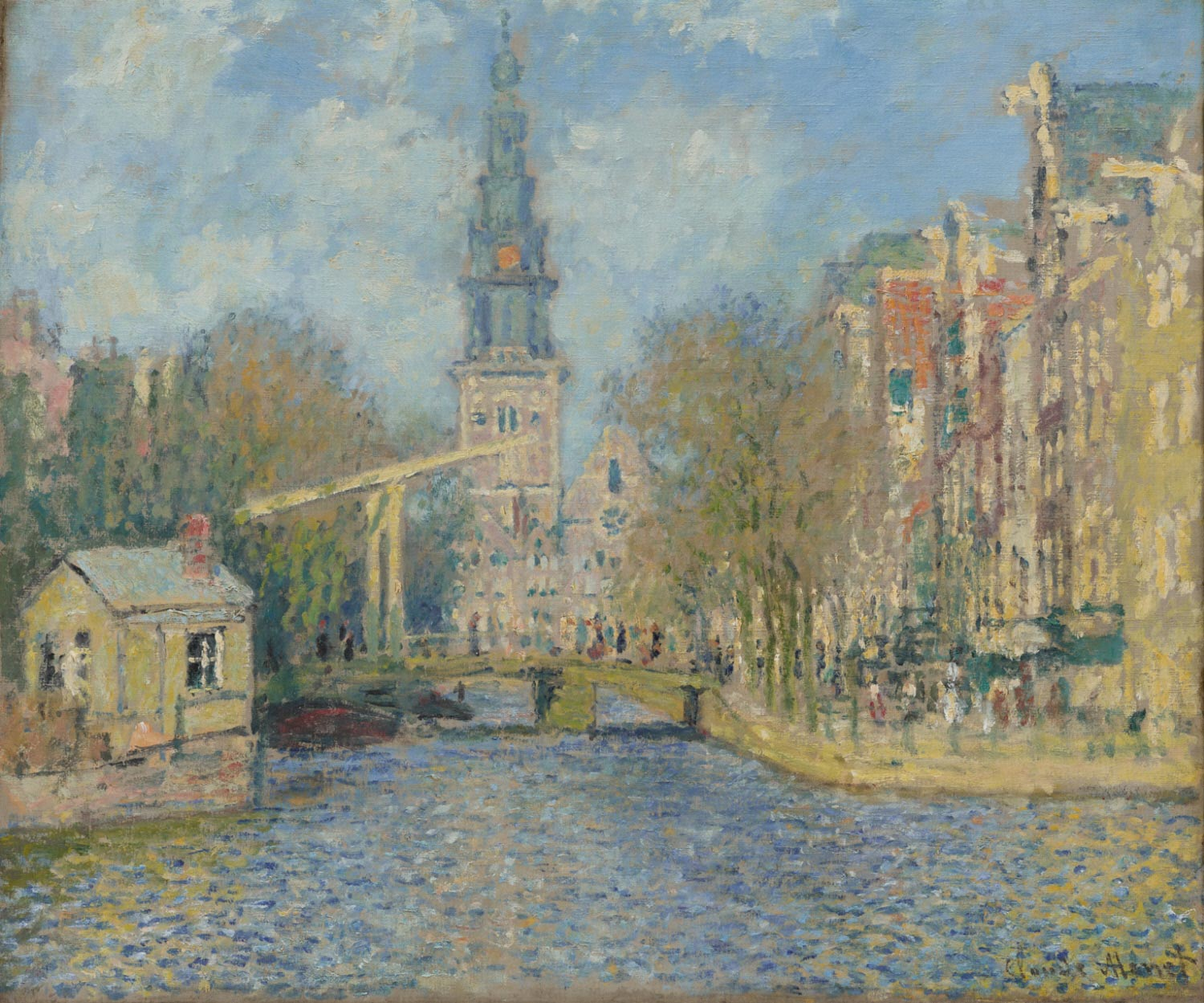
The Zuiderkerk, Amsterdam (Looking up the Groenburgwal) by Claude Monet

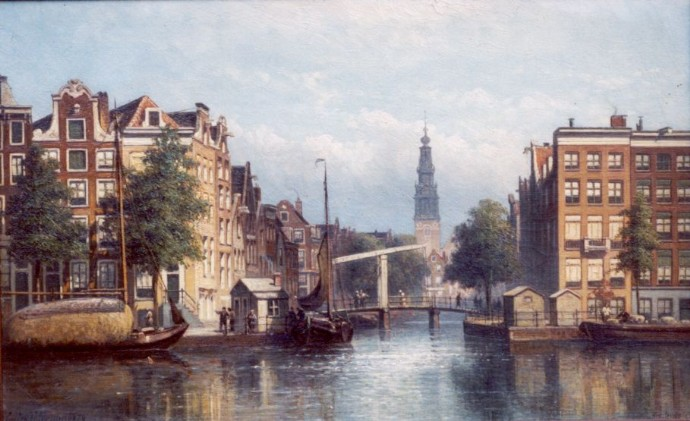
Groenburgwal and River Amstel, Amsterdam (1879). Oil on canvas.

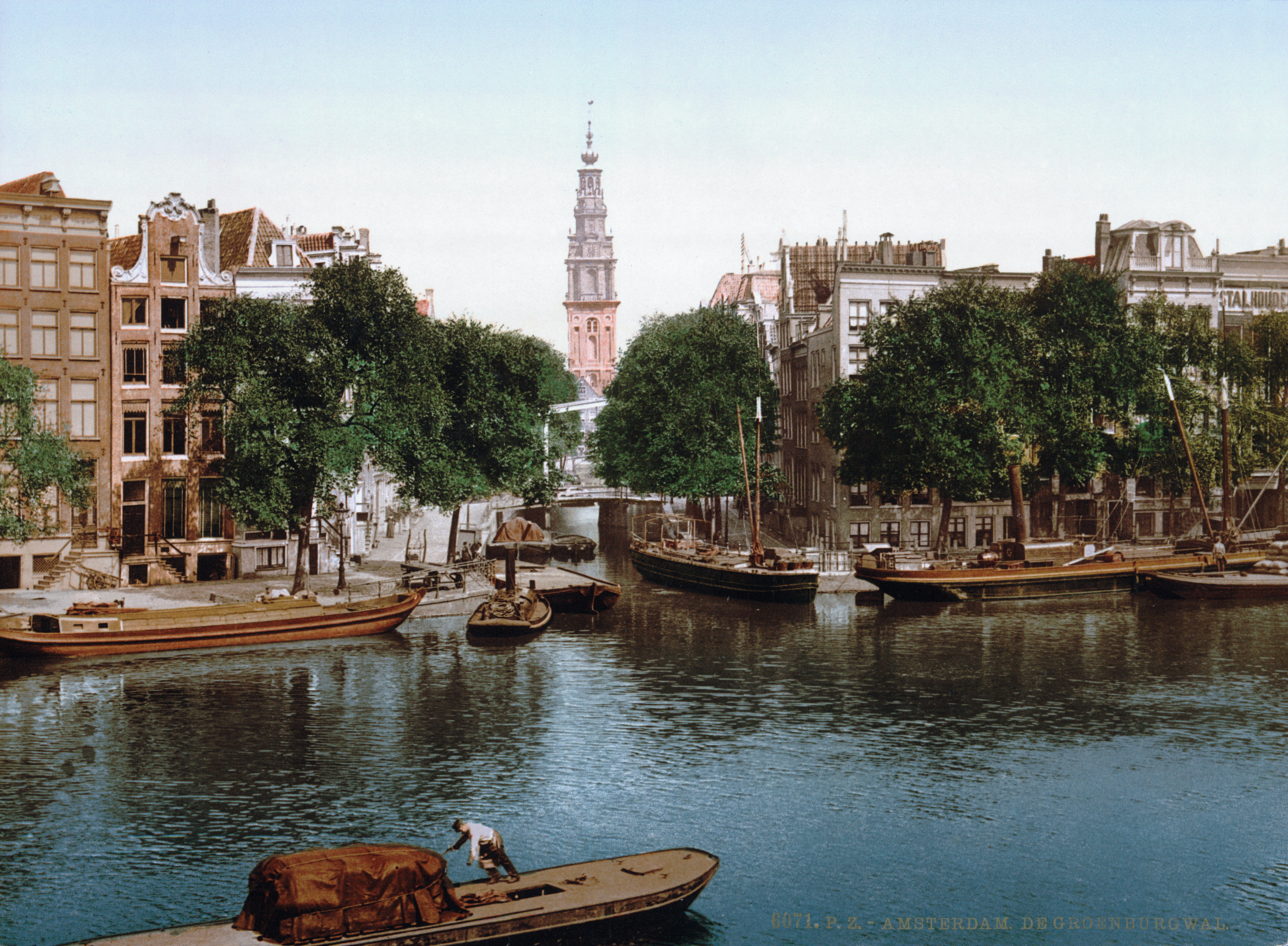
Groenburgwal, as seen from Amstel river, with the Zuiderkerkstoren in the background; around 1900.

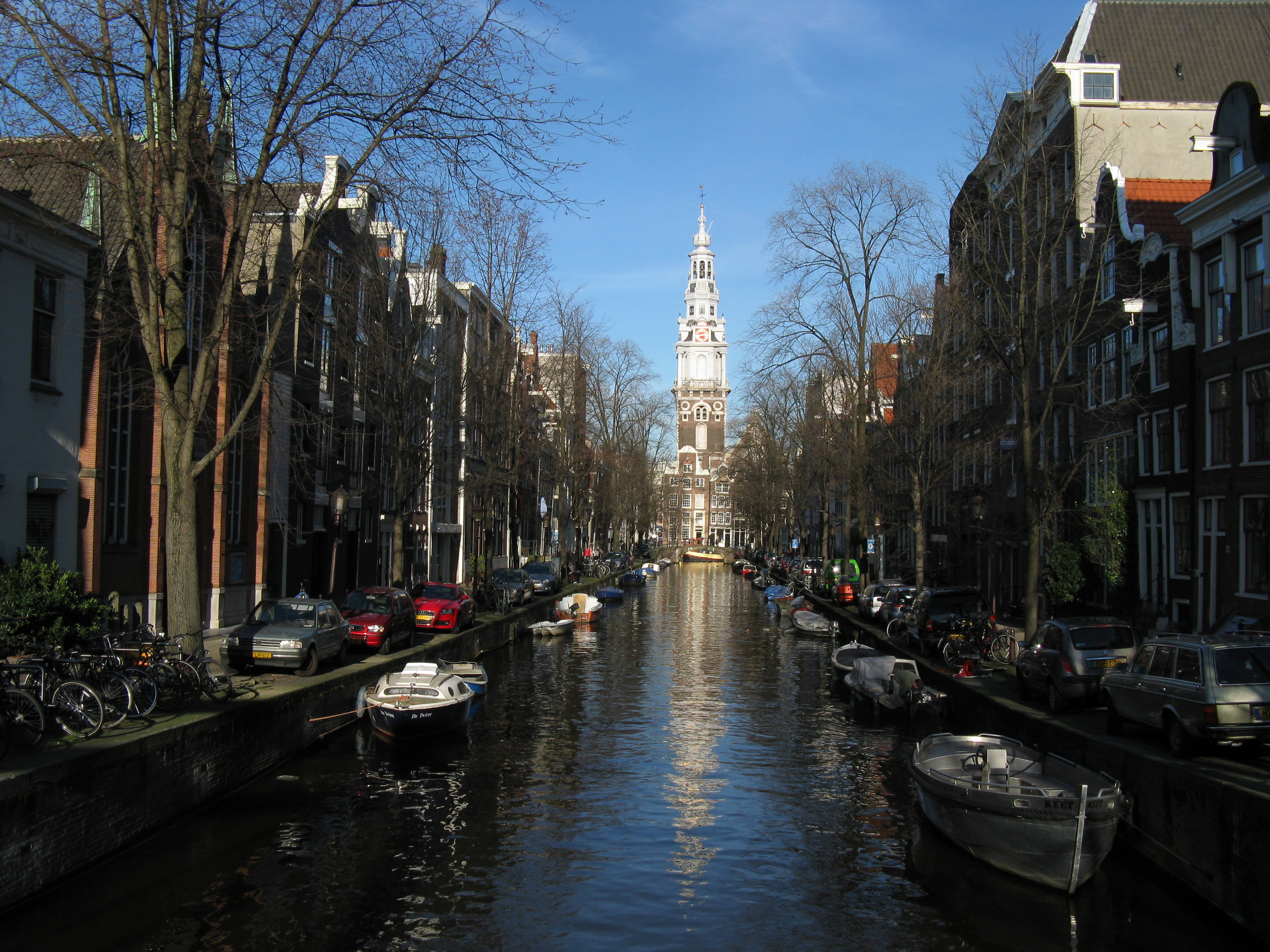
Groenburgwal with a view of Zuiderkerkstoren.

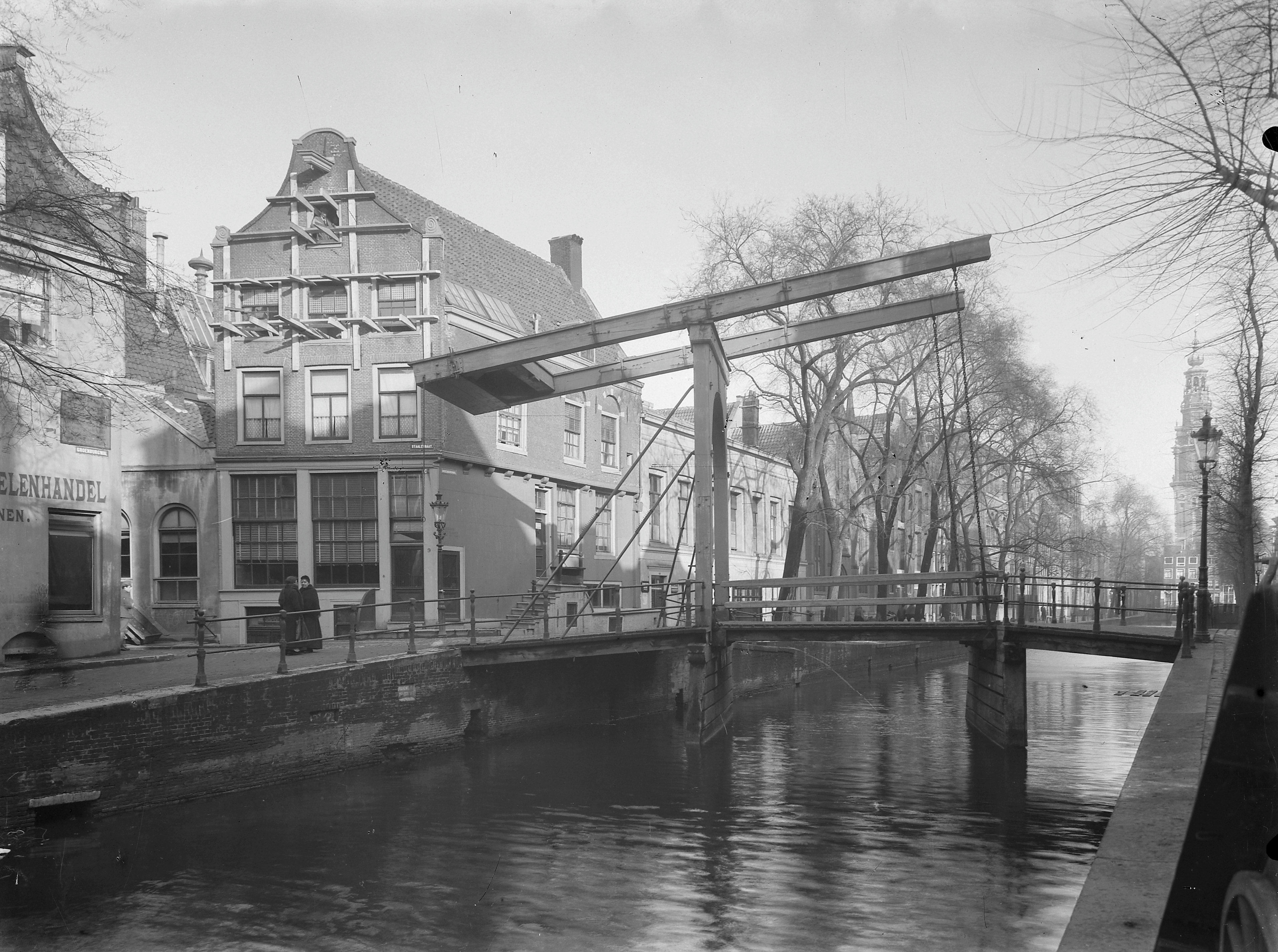
Drawbridge (bridge number 227) crossing Groenburgwal; early 20th century.

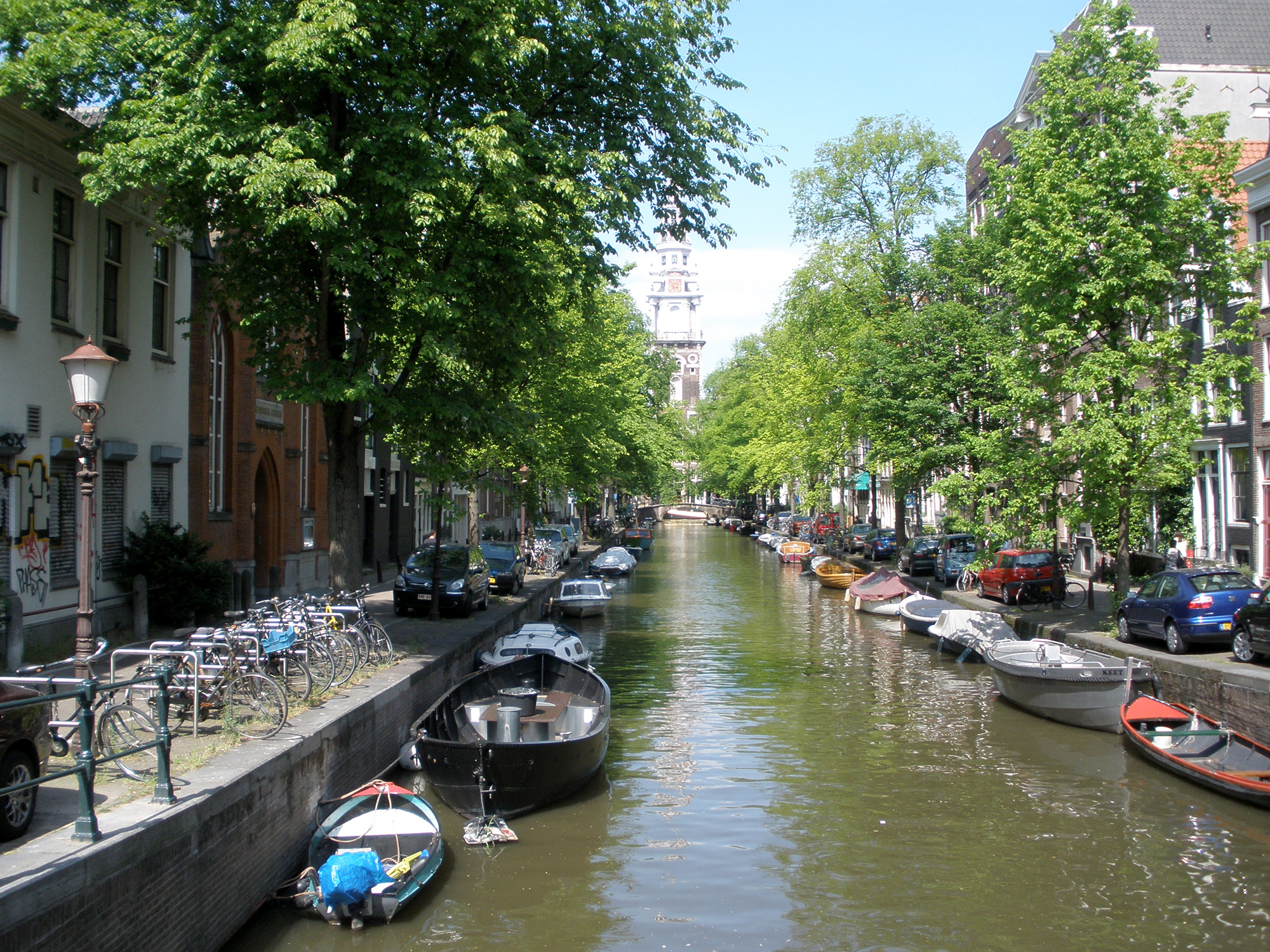
Groenburgwal.

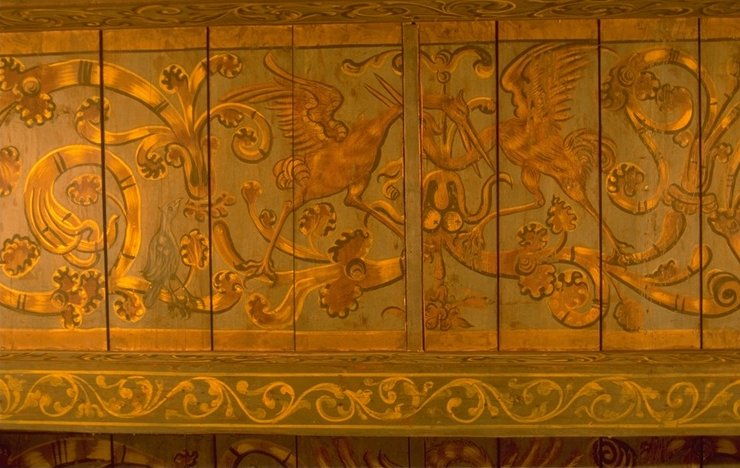
Ceiling painting, dated 1633, at 61 Groenburgwal.

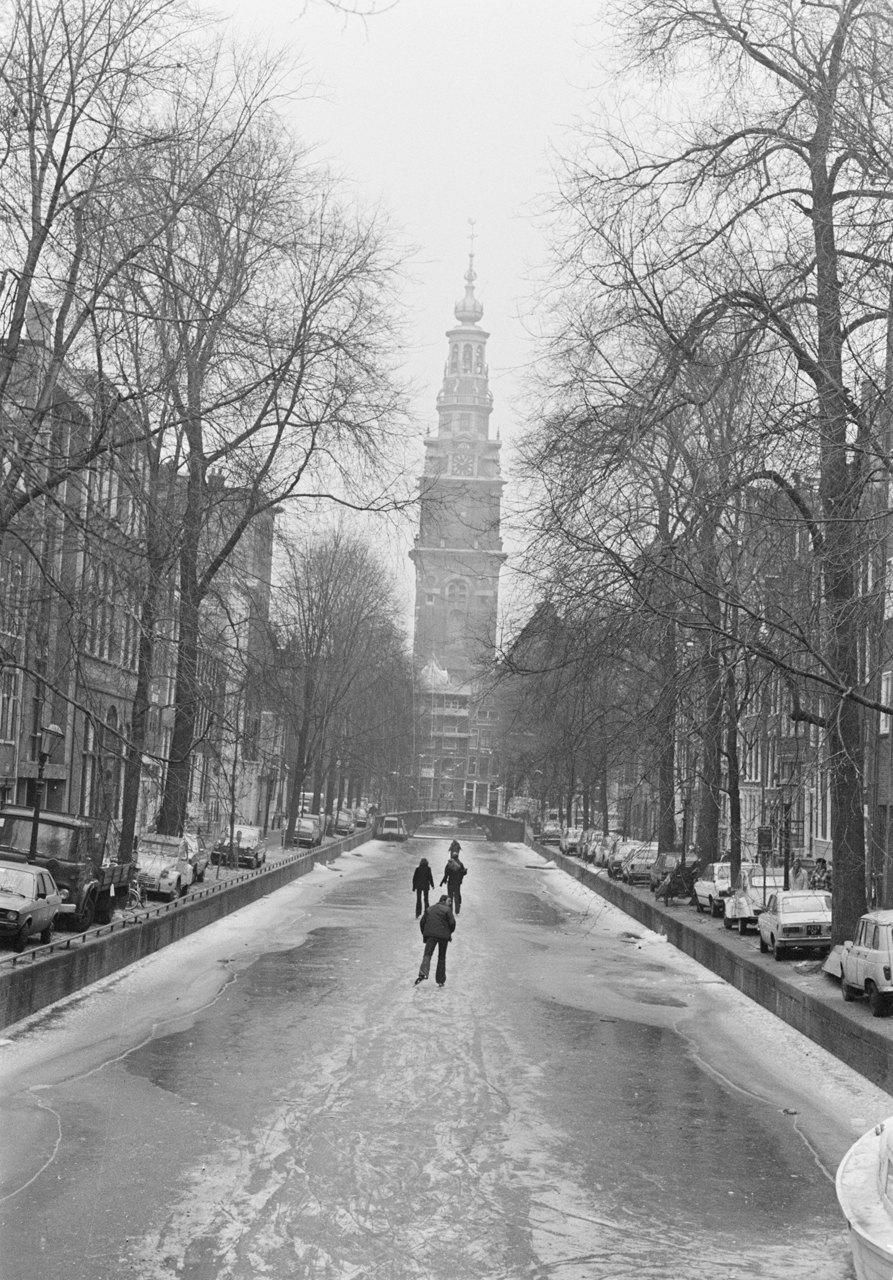
Frozen Groenburgwal with ice-skaters; february 5th, 1976.

== See also ==
- Canals of Amsterdam
