= Gottfried Mind =

Swiss artist (1768–1814)

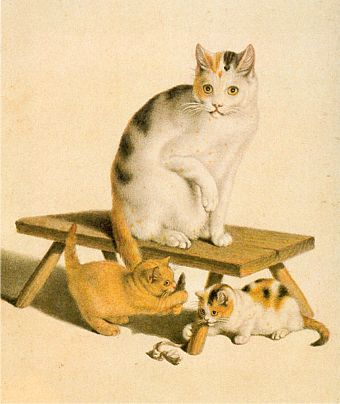
- Cats, watercolor by Gottfried Mind
- Born: 25 September 1768; Bern, Switzerland
- Died: 17 November 1814 (aged 46); Bern, Switzerland
- Occupation: Artist
- Known for: Animal drawing, particularly cats and bears

Gottfried Mind (German pronunciation: [ˈɡɔtfriːd ˈmɪnd]; 25 September 1768 – 17 November 1814) was a Swiss artist and savant who specialized in drawing. He was widely known as the Raphael of Cats due to his exceptional skill and naturalism in depicting felines.

== Early life ==
Gottfried Mind was born in Bern in 1768. His father was a Hungarian joiner and form-cutter who had settled in Worblaufen to work in the paper manufactory of Samuel Emanuel Gruner. Mind suffered from a weak physical constitution and was largely left to his own devices as a child.

His early exposure to art came through his father's employer, Gruner, who was an art collector (and who notably sold a blank sketchbook to J. M. W. Turner during the latter's 1802 visit to Bern). A German artist named Legel, who was staying at Gruner's house, allowed the young Mind to observe him work and study Gruner's collection of prints, including the animal engravings of Johann Elias Ridinger. Mind attempted to copy these works, showing a particular preference for lions, and eventually began drawing sheep, goats, and cats from nature. Mind's father initially disapproved of drawing on paper, encouraging his son to work with wood instead. Mind subsequently became adept at carving wooden animals, which became popular local decorations.

Between the ages of eight and ten, Mind attended the academy for poor children established by the educational reformer Johann Heinrich Pestalozzi at Neuenhof. In 1778, Pestalozzi documented Mind as a "strange creature, full of artist-caprices" who was incapable of hard labor but entirely devoted to drawing.

== Art education ==
Around the age of fourteen, Mind was apprenticed to the Swiss painter Sigmund Freudenberger (sometimes referred to as Hendenberger) in Bern. Mind's education was almost exclusively artistic; he remained mostly illiterate, struggling to write his own name, and lacked basic arithmetic skills. Under Freudenberger, Mind learned to draw and work with watercolors, primarily assisting his master by coloring prints of Swiss peasant life.

Mind's specialized talent for drawing cats was reportedly discovered when he criticized a cat in one of Freudenberger's sketches, stating bluntly, "That is no cat!" Challenged to do better, Mind produced a drawing that so impressed Freudenberger that he allowed Mind to finish the figure and began copying his pupil's work.

== Work and legacy ==
Following Freudenberger's death in 1801, Mind remained employed by his widow, who recognized the commercial value of his independent work. While he continued to paint traditional scenes of peasant children playing, his primary focus shifted to animal subjects. He maintained a close relationship with domestic animals, frequently painting while cats rested on his shoulders or lap. Though he often exhibited a gruff demeanor toward human visitors, his connection to his subjects was profound.

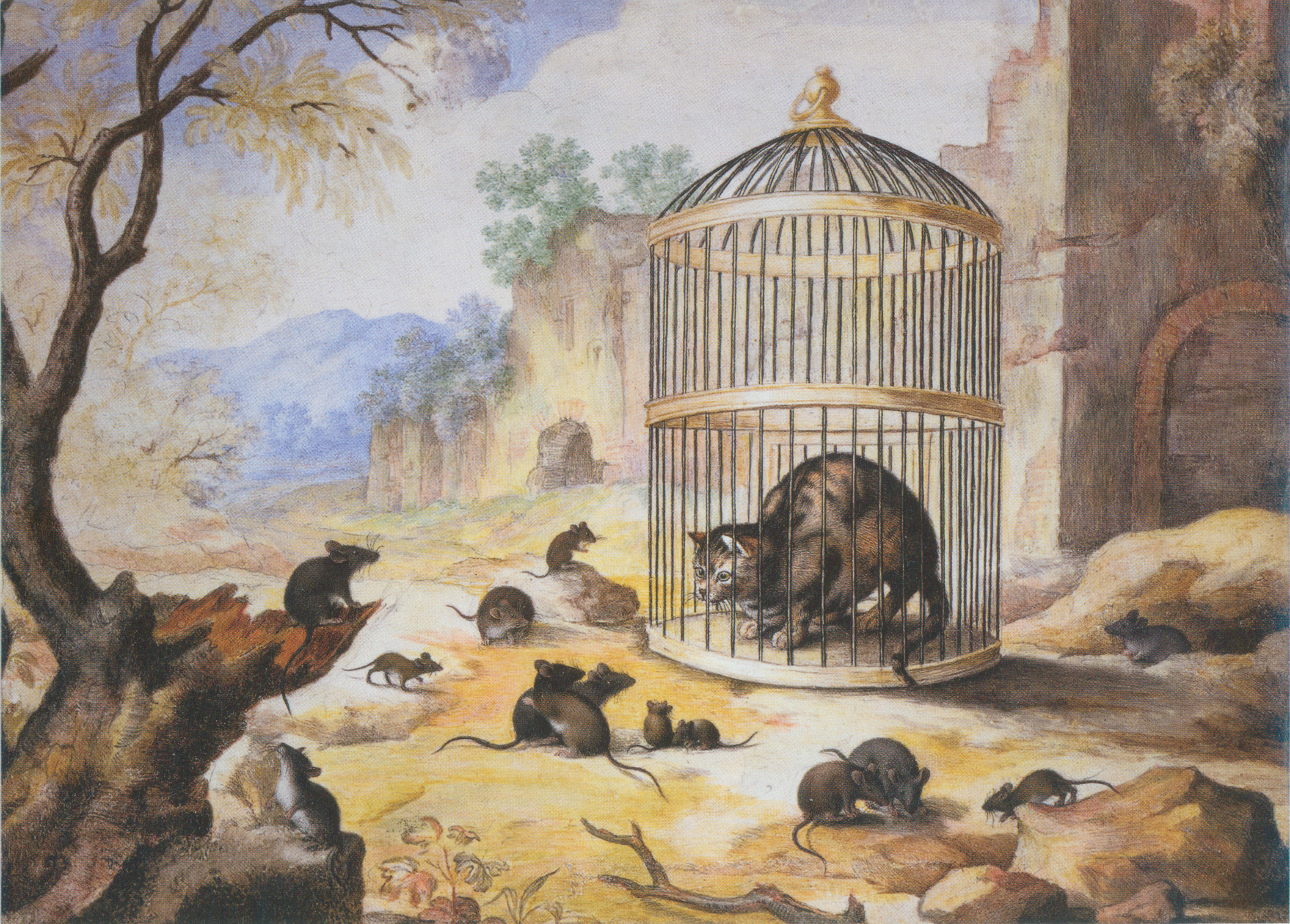
Cat in a Cage

Despite having no formal training in animal anatomy, Mind's depictions of cats were highly regarded for their precision and naturalism. He accurately captured their complex movements, musculature, and behavioral quirks without anthropomorphizing them. He also spent significant time observing and drawing the bears at the Bärengraben (bear pit) in Bern, establishing a rapport with the animals and producing highly regarded bear portraits.

Mind possessed a remarkable visual memory; he rarely drew directly from life, preferring to study his subjects and reproduce them with strict fidelity from memory later. He held strong opinions on art, favoring the animal depictions of Peter Paul Rubens, Rembrandt, and Paulus Potter, while openly criticizing the celebrated feline works of Cornelis Visscher and Wenzel Hollar.

His reputation earned him the nickname "The Raphael of Cats." This moniker is often attributed to the French painter Élisabeth Vigée Le Brun, who traveled through Bern in 1807 and admired his work. Decades later, Mind's work experienced a resurgence in popularity among French artists and intellectuals when the critic Champfleury featured Mind's drawings in his 1869 book Les chats: Histoire, moeurs, observations, anecdotes. This publication, advertised with a poster by Édouard Manet, helped cement Mind's status within a 19th-century "cult of the cat" that included literary figures like Charles Baudelaire.

== Medical and psychiatric historical context ==
Throughout the 19th and 20th centuries, Mind's life and condition became a subject of interest in the developing fields of psychiatry and neurology. Modern retrospective diagnoses often classify him as an autistic savant, prominently featuring him in foundational texts on the subject.

During his own era and the subsequent century, however, his condition was viewed through the medical lens of his time. George Fairholme, who compiled Mind's works into the 1831 collection Mindiana, characterized him as a "cretin imbecile" who was affected by a goiter at an early age. Historically, "cretinism" (now understood as congenital iodine deficiency syndrome) was strongly associated with the Alps, where iodine-poor soil led to frequent developmental and physical impairments.

Later psychiatric theorists, including William W. Ireland and Alfred Tredgold, utilized Mind's biography as a primary case study. Tredgold discussed Mind in his 1908 work Mental Deficiency (Amentia), while Ireland argued that Mind's case proved that a "constructive or mechanical turn is more frequently preserved amongst idiots than any other gift," comparing his innate predisposition for art to the musical prodigies of Mozart and Handel.

== Death ==
In late 1813, Mind began suffering from "an increasing disorder in the breast" (described in contemporary accounts as "dropsy in the chest") which left him unable to exert himself. He died of the illness on 17 November 1814, at the age of 46.

== See also ==
- Sal Meijer, Dutch artist also known as "The Raphael of Cats"

== Bibliography ==
- Franz Wiedemann: Der Katzenraphael. Lebensbild eines seltsamen Künstlers. 2. Auflage. Oehmigke, Leipzig 1887
- Adolf Koelsch: Gottfried Mind, der Katzen-Raffael. Versuch eines Lebensbildes. Montana, Zürich und Stuttgart 1924
- Katzen. Texte aus der Weltliteratur. Hrsg. von Federico Hindermann. Mit Illustrationen von Gottfried Mind. Manesse im dtv, München 1994 ISBN 3-423-24044-X
