= Edwin Bormann =

German writer (1851–1912)

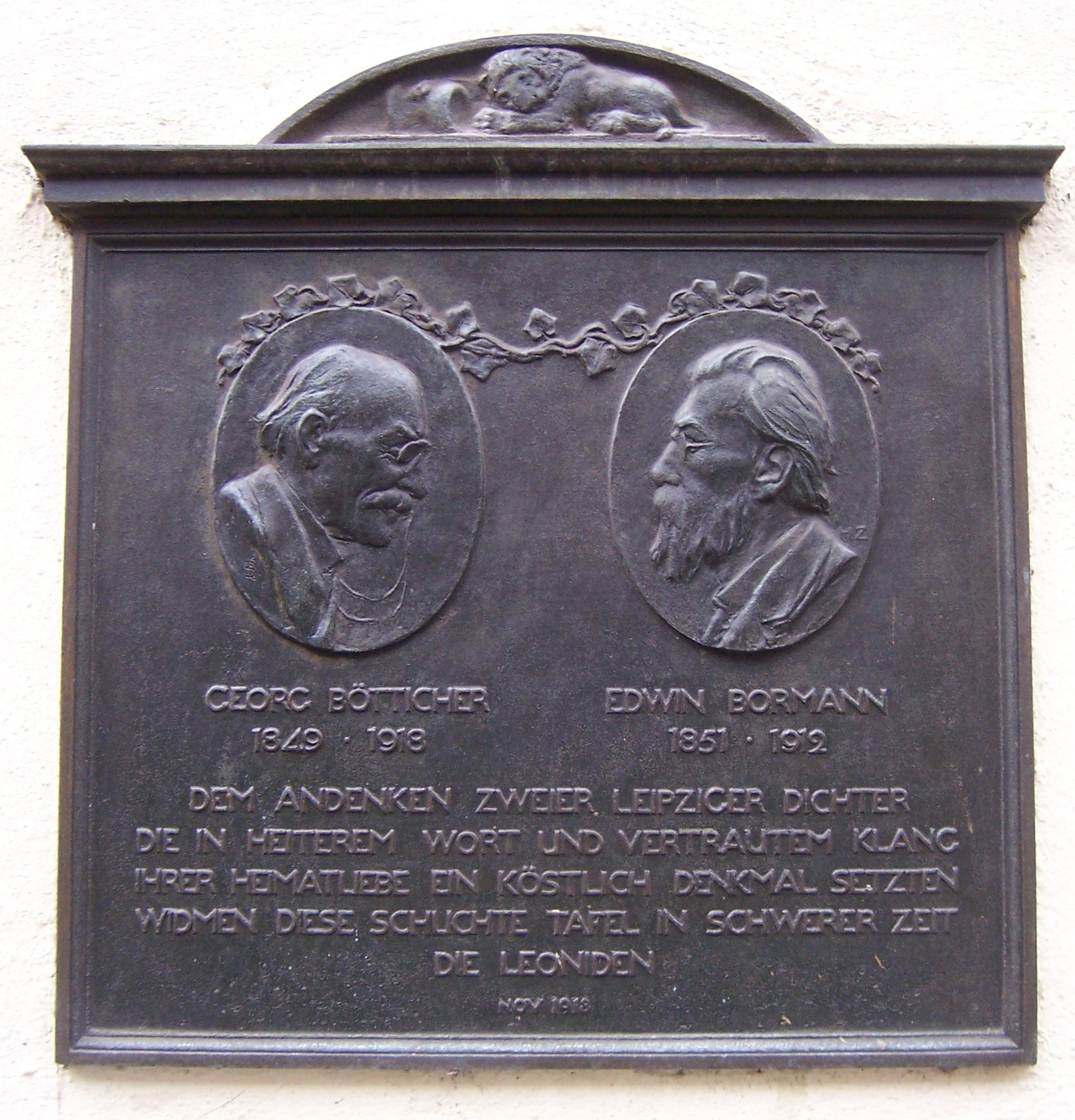
Memorial plaque for Edwin Bormann at the Old Town Hall in Leipzig

Edwin Bormann (14 April 1851 – 3 May 1912) was a German writer. He also published under the pseudonym "Bliemchen".

== Life ==
Borman was born in Leipzig. After he had to abandon architectural studies begun in 1867 at the Dresden University of Technology for health reasons, he studied Natural Sciences, History of Art, Germanistics and philosophy at the University of Leipzig and the Rheinische Friedrich-Wilhelms-Universität Bonn from 1869 to 1875. He then returned to his home town of Leipzig, where he founded his own publishing house in 1888 to publish his works. In 1909, together with Georg Bötticher and Arthur von Oettingen, he founded the artists' association Leoniden, which donated a plaque to him and Bötticher at the New Town Hall in 1918. For decades, he was a contributor to the satirical-humorous German weekly magazine Fliegende Blätter.

== Work ==
Bormann emerged above all as an Upper Saxon German dialect poet. In addition, he wrote poem collages such as his Schilleressenz, in which he assembled quotations into a new text in the manner of the Cento quotations into a new text. The title of his book Jedes Thierchen hat sein Pläsierchen entered the German treasure trove of quotations.

In several publications, he also advocated the so-called Shakespeare-Bacon theory, which considers Francis Bacon to be the author of the works published under the name of the actor William Shakespeare. In contrast to other proponents of the theory, he tried — by his own admission — to prove it by showing an indissoluble connection between Shakespeare's poetry and Bacon's scientific-philosophical works. Thus, he argued, The Tempest was a parable for Bacon's natural philosophy, King Lear for economics and Hamlet for anthropology.

Bormann died in Leipzig at the age of 62 and is buried at the Friedenspark.

== Publications (selection) ==
- Reineke Fuchs (Freie Nachdichtung des niederdeutschen Reinke de Vos.). Flemming, Glogau 1881 (together with Julius Lohmeyer and Fedor Flinzer).
- De Säck'sche Schweiz un das geliebde Dräsen. Vaterländsche Reim- un Farwen-Boesien. Fischer, Leipzig 1891.
- Leipz'ger Lerchen. Neie Boesieen von ännen alden Leibz`ger. Edwin Bormann`s Selbstverlag Leipzig Erscheinungsjahr 1893, 160 pages.
- Das Shakespeare-Geheimniss. Bormann, Leipzig 1894.
- Der Anekdotenschatz Bacon-Shakespeare's. Heiter-ernsthafte Selbstbekenntnisse des Dichter-Gelehrten. Bormann Selbstverlag, Leipzig, 1895.
- S Buch von Klabberstorche, o. J.
- Der historische Beweis der Bacon-Shakespeare-Theorie. Bormann, Leipzig 1897.
- Wenn Gedhe und Schiller gemiethlich sin. Ä klassischer Lorbeerkranz. Selbstverlag, Leipzig 1899.
- Die Kunst des Pseudonyms. 12 literarhistorisch-bibliographische Essays. Bormann Selbstverlag, Leipzig 1901.
- Francis Bacon’s Reim-Geheimschrift und ihre Enthüllungen. Self-published, Leipzig 1906.
