= Hoffmann's Stärkefabriken =

German company

- Company type: Private
- Industry: Starch production, food chemicals
- Founded: 1850
- Defunct: 1990
- Successor: Reckitt
- Headquarters: Bad Salzuflen, North Rhine-Westphalia, Germany
- Area served: Germany
- Products: Starch, food chemicals

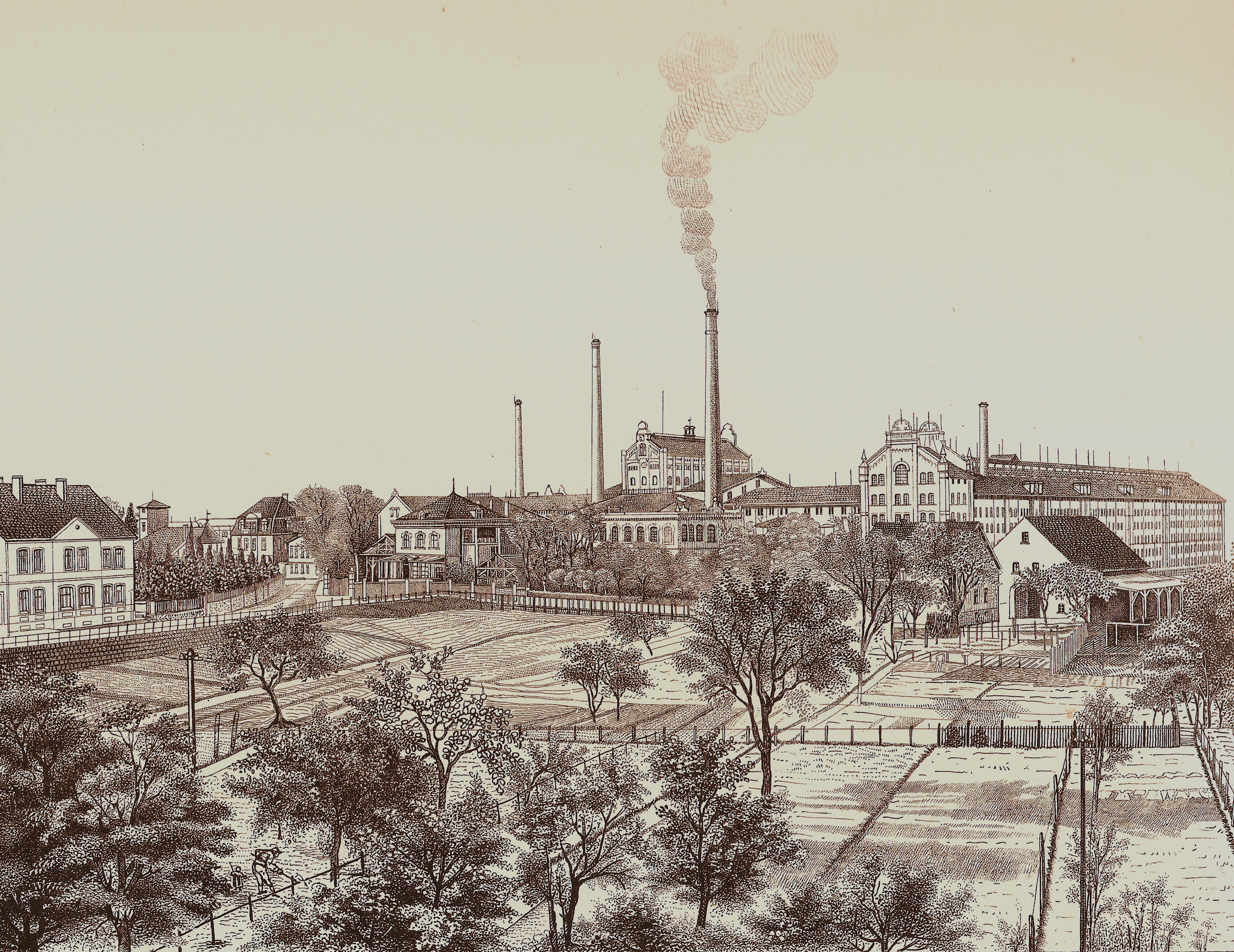
A picture from 1890 showing Hoffmann’s Stärkefabriken

Hoffmann's Stärkefabriken (English: Hoffman's Starch Factories) was a German company that produced starch and food chemicals. It was founded in 1850 and ceased operations in 1990.

It was the oldest industrial company in Bad Salzuflen, North Rhine-Westphalia-area of Germany.

== Annual reports ==
For the year 1904, the Supervisory Board, including the carryover from 1903 (95,149.19 marks), reported a net profit of 865,284.64 marks. Of this, 516,000 marks were distributed to shareholders as a 4% dividend and an 8% special dividend, 40,000 marks were booked for extra depreciation, and 65,000 marks were paid as a bonus to the Supervisory Board. 74,111.50 marks were allocated, among other things, to the funds for welfare institutions, the pension and support fund, and the factory health insurance fund.

== See also ==
- Starch mill
