= Sal Meijer =

Dutch artist

- Self portrait, c.1900-1910
- Born: 6 December 1877; Amsterdam, Netherlands
- Died: 1 February 1965 (aged 87); Blaricum, Netherlands
- Known for: Painting

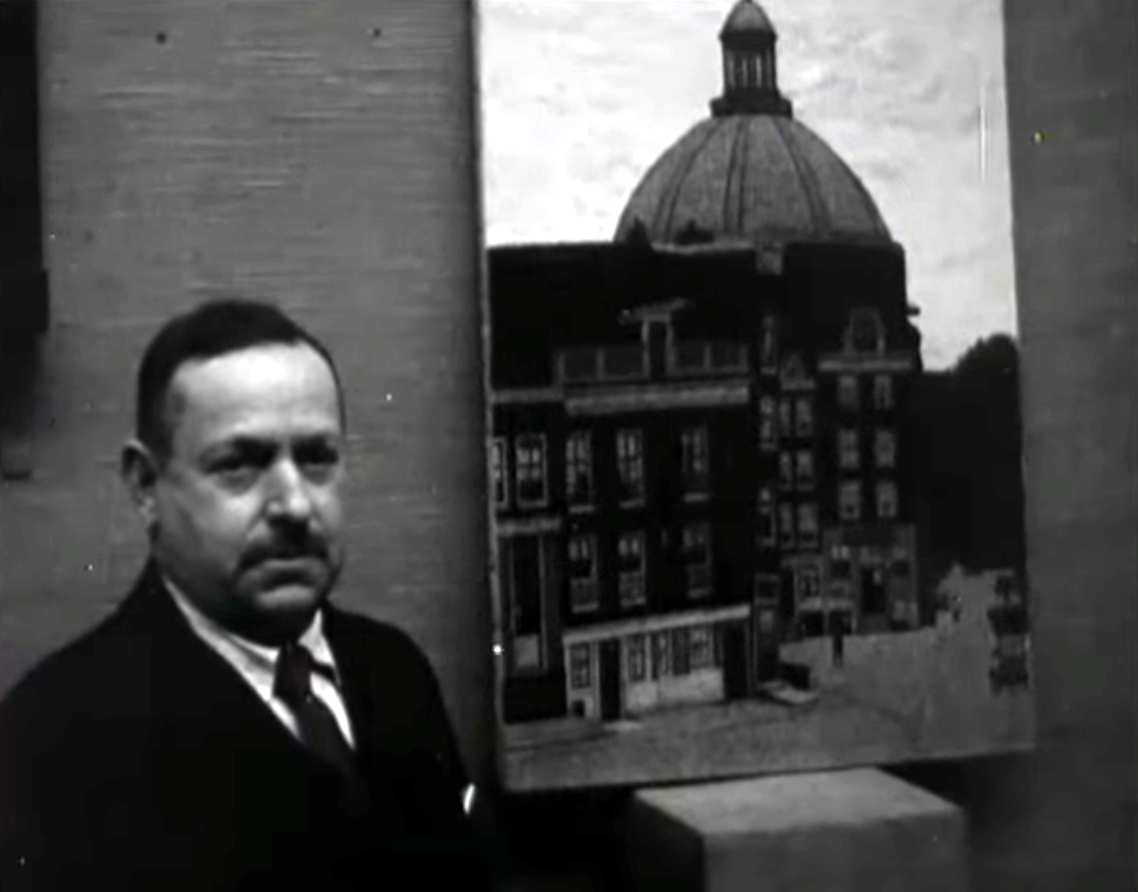
Meijer in 1932

Salomon "Sal" Meijer (Amsterdam, December 6, 1877 - Blaricum, February 1, 1965) was a Dutch painter, primarily known for his paintings of cats and Amsterdam city views. Works by Meijer are on view at the Jewish Historical Museum and the Kattenkabinet cat museum in Amsterdam, among others.

Sal or "Sally" Meijer was born at Zwanenburgwal 10 as the son of Jewish diamond-cutters. In his youth, he worked in the diamond industry while studying art. He devoted himself full-time to painting in 1914. His first one-man exhibition was in 1926.

Meijer's work was included in the 1939 exhibition and sale Onze Kunst van Heden (Our Art of Today) at the Rijksmuseum in Amsterdam.

His marriage to the non-Jewish Liesje Giehl in 1930 caused so much friction with his parents that he moved out of his parents' home and moved the following year to the village of Blaricum, which had a vibrant artists' community. Following the German occupation of the Netherlands during World War II, Meijer was banned from exhibiting his paintings; however, his mixed marriage enabled him to survive the war.

In 1957, he was honored at a ceremony by the Blaricum artists' society to mark his 80th birthday. At this occasion, the Dutch state purchased one of his paintings, depicting the Raamgracht canal in Amsterdam. In 1958, the Stedelijk Museum in Amsterdam presented an overview of his work. After his death in 1965, a memorial exhibition was held at Zeist palace. Meijer was buried at the Jewish cemetery in Muiderberg.

Due to the simplicity of Meijer's paintings and his modest attitude - he did not regard his paintings as works of art but as craftmanship - his work was often labeled as "naive" and "primitive". However, a re-evaluation of his work began in 1957 with the article "Onze grootste moderne primitief - Schilder van betekenis" ("Our greatest modern primitive - Painter of importance") by Kasper Niehuis. The book Sal Meijer, zo naïef nog niet ("Sal Meijer, not that naive") by Agnes Grondman followed in 1986. In 1990, a small book about his paintings of cats was published, Sal Meijer: Raphaël der katten ("Sal Meijer: Raphael of cats") by Nicole Ex. (The title Raphael of Cats had previously been given to Swiss artist Gottfried Mind (1768–1814)). And in 2007, an exhibition of never before-shown drawings and oil paintings by Meijer and Melle Oldeboerrigter was held at the Amsterdam artists' society Arti et Amicitiae.

== Sources ==
- Jewish Historical Museum (Dutch)
- Kattenkabinet
