= Georg Bötticher =

German graphic artist

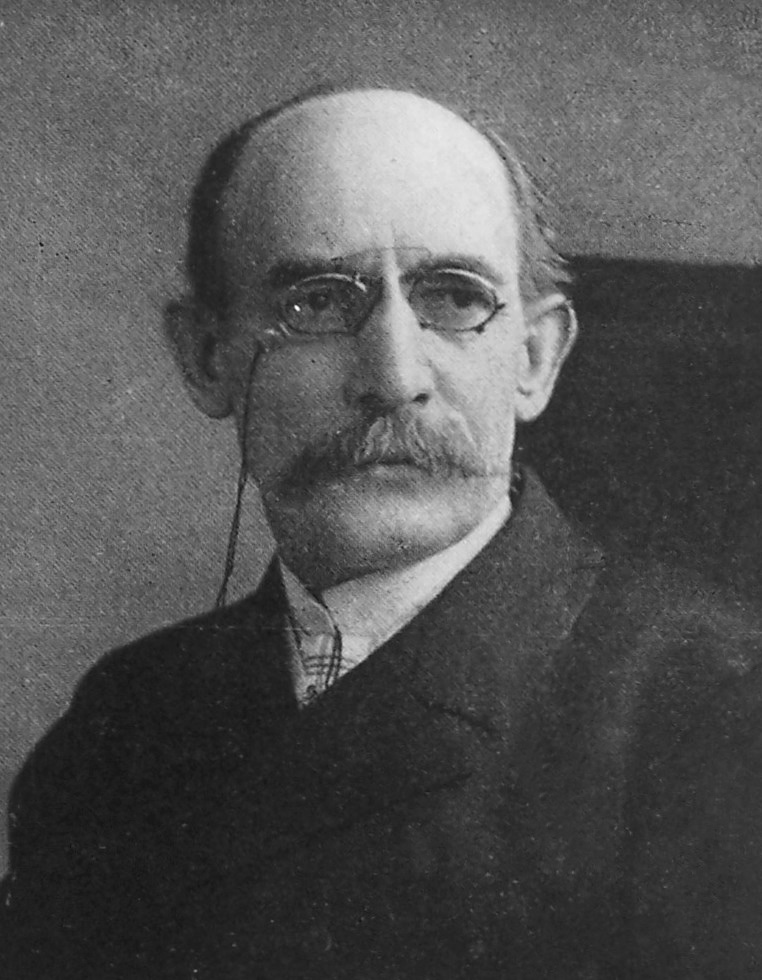
Georg Bötticher

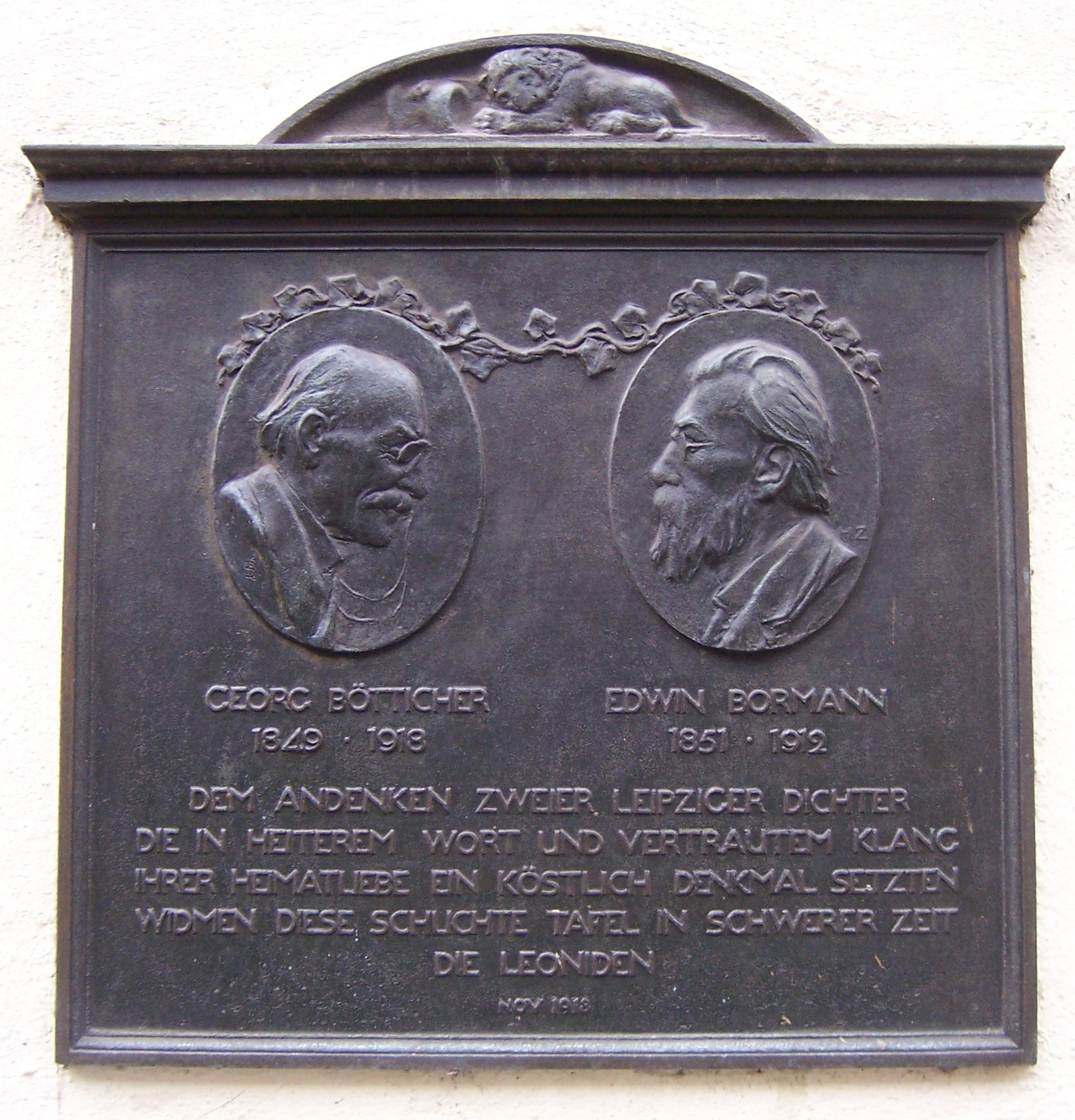
Commemorative plaque of the Leoniden for Georg Bötticher and Edwin Bormann at the former city house of Leipzig

Georg Bötticher (20 May 1849 – 15 January 1918) was a German graphic artist, writer and publisher.

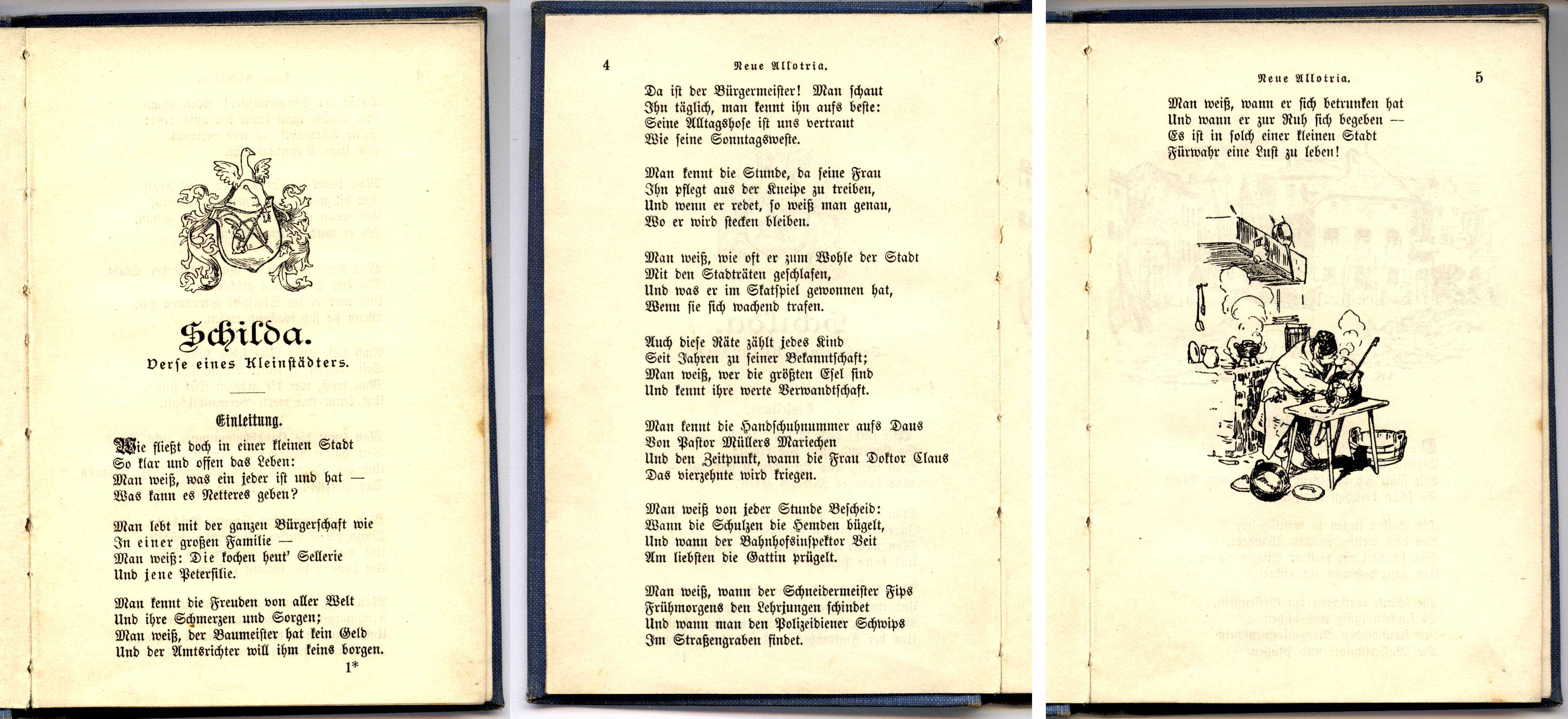
Gedichtbandes New Allotria, which also contains 33 drawings by Julius Kleinmichel

== Life ==
Born in Jena, Bötticher was the second son of the pastor Hans Adam Bötticher (1811–1849), who died in March 1849 in Görmar near Mühlhausen in Thuringia, and his wife Clementine Bötticher née Hand. After her husband's death, Clementine had moved into her parents' house in Jena with their elder son Karl. Georg Bötticher's maternal grandfather was the Privy Councillor, Professor Ferdinand Gotthelf Hand, who became known as a philologist and musicologist. Hand had taught the Weimar princesses Augusta and Maria, led a singing society for years and written a respected Aesthetics of Musical Art. As a young professor, he had still held office in Weimar under Goethe.

Bötticher came from a very traditional family that can be traced back a long way, whose roots can be traced back to the year 1365. The philosopher and orientalist Paul de Lagarde (1827–1891), whose real name was Paul Anton Bötticher, belongs to this family. Also belonging to this family are the former mayor of Goldingen (now Kuldiga/Latvia) Friedrich von Boetticher (1749–1819), the co-founder and editor of the "Baltische Monatsschrift" Theodor von Boetticher (1819–1901), the founder and manager of a publishing and art bookshop Friedrich von Boetticher (1820–1902), the ship and military doctor and later director of a sanatorium Theodor von Boetticher (1869–1932) and other recognised personalities belonged to the Bötticher/von Boetticher family.

Bötticher grew up in his grandparents' house in Jena and attended the Zenker Institute during his primary school years. From 1856, he transferred to the Freemason Institute in Dresden to continue his schooling and graduated in 1863. Afterwards he learned the profession of a pattern draughtsman at the Dresden Polytechnic, which later became the School of Arts and Crafts. He completed his training in 1866 and then attended the weaving school in Chemnitz for a year, where he also worked in a wool factory as a trainee. To further deepen his professional education he worked in the leading Parisian art shop of Artur Martins from 1869. However, he had to leave France shortly after the outbreak of the Franco-Prussian War in 1870.

Once back in Germany, he worked as a pattern draughtsman in Mühlhausen in Thuringia. At about the same time, he also began his literary work and made his debut as a writer for children and young people in the magazine Deutsche Jugend. Afterwards he moved to Dresden, where he worked as a draughtsman for wallpapers, carpets, upholstery fabrics and book covers. Here he also wrote his highly acclaimed book "Original-Compositionen zu Flachmustern", which was published in Dresden. Further places of activity in his profession were then Mannheim and Jena until he moved to Wurzen in 1875 moved here to take up employment in a wallpaper factory as a draughtsman for pattern designs for wallpaper, upholstery fabric and carpet manufacture. After he had somewhat consolidated himself in this position, he married Rosa Marie (Maria) Engelhart in Jena in 1876. In the following years, the marriage produced the children Wolfgang (1879–1946), Ottilie, later married Mitter (1882–1957) and Hans (1884–1934), who later called himself Joachim Ringelnatz as a writer and cabaretist.

Bötticher was a very successful pattern draughtsman who, in his professional heyday, supplied designs and patterns to France (Paris), Sweden, Russia and America. In the mid-1870s he also moved on to regular literary publications, some of which he published in Upper Saxon Dialect and under the pseudonym C.Engelhart (his wife's name). This was followed by texts for Bilderbücher with illustrations by graphic artists from his circle of acquaintances. Having moved to Leipzig with his family in 1897, he published Das chinesische Buch (The Chinese Book) with illustrations by Rudolf Alfred Jaumann. The much more intensively established art scene in Leipzig and the great interest in his work were of particular benefit to him. Here, further of his books How the Soldiers Wanted to Become Animals (1892), together with illustrations by his friend Fedor Flinzer, "Der Deutsche Michel", "Allotria" and, in 1895, "Das lustige Jena" were published. He also wrote a book about his family entitled "Meine Lieben", which appeared in 1897. This was followed by "Balladen, Legenden und Schwänke" [Ballads, Legends and Tales] and, together with Lothar Meggendorfer, the book "Der Verwandlungskünstler" [The Transformer] in 1899. However, from about 1900 onwards he was plagued by an eye condition that affected his eyesight and increasingly prevented him from working at the drawing table. For this reason, he increasingly moved into the literary field. Thus Georg Bötticher became the editor of Auerbach's Deutsches Kinder-Kalender from 1901 until 1918. He worked in the circle of Ekkehard poets and was an ardent supporter of Otto von Bismarck. In addition, he devoted himself to literary-historical contributions on Johann Wolfgang Goethe and Joseph Victor von Scheffel. He also worked for the humorous magazines Fliegende Blätter and Meggendorfer-Blätter as well as for Die Jugend. Bötticher took an active part in the cultural life of his time. Not only satirical work is characteristic of him, but also the examination of individual fellow human beings, the literary processing of behavioural norms, for example in the book Gesellschaftsregeln and he created the literary figure of the Leutnant von Versewitz. From 1901 to 1905, "Das lyrische Tagebuch des Leutnants von Versewitz" was published in three volumes. A total of over 40 published books from his pen are known. Their names are mostly "cheerfully" selected such as "Allotria", "Alfanzereien", "Schnick-Schnack" and many more. Everything flowed quite easily from his hand. But he also wrote ballads, stories and, in later years, essays on cultural and literary history.

Particularly during his time in Leipzig, he maintained a large circle of friends, including the writer Edwin Bornmann (1851–1912), the poet Victor Blüthgen (1844–1920), the writer Julius Lohmeyer (1834–1903), the graphic artist Julius Kleinmichel (1846–1892), the sculptor Max Klinger (1857–1920), the poet Detlev von Liliencron (1844–1909), the journalist Julius Stinde (1841–1905), the sculptor Carl Seffner (1861–1932) and the writer Johann Trajan (1837–1952) were among them. He maintained an active correspondence with, among others, the writer Theodor Fontane (1819–1899), the writer Gustav Freytag (1816–1895), the poet Emanuel Geibel (1815–1884), the writer Paul Heyse (1830–1914), the painter Adolph Menzel (1815–1905), the poet Conrad Ferdinand Meyer (1825–1898) and the writer Wilhelm Raabe (1831–1910). In 1909, together with Edwin Bormann and Arthur von Oettingen, he founded the Leipziger Künstlerbund der Leoniden.

On 15 January 1918, Bötticher died at the age of 68 in Leipzig after only four days of influenza in Leipzig. He was buried at the Neuer Johannisfriedhof in Leipzig in his mother's grave.

== Aftermath ==
A year after his death, to honour him, a plaque of the "Leonides" Edwin Bormann and Georg Bötticher was erected at the Leipzig City Hall. At the ceremonial inauguration on 16 April 1919, his son Joachim Ringelnatz spoke the poem "Junge an Alte 1919". Part of Georg Bötticher's artistic estate, including numerous designs for patterns, is in the collections of the Grassi Museum in Leipzig. In 2010, a new compilation of Georg Bötticher's Poems was published, with a cover graphic by Udo Degener, edition grillenfänger, Udo Degener Verlag, Potsdam 2010, ISBN 978-3-940531-17-9.

== Work ==
- Original-Compositionen zu Flachmustern. Tapeten, Gewebe, Intarsien etc. Dresden 1875.
- Schulerinnerungen. Leipzig 1877.
- with Rudolf Alfred Jaumann: Das chinesische Buch. Leipzig 1898.
- with Fedor Flinzer: Wie die Soldaten Tiere werden wollten. Leipzig 1892.
- with Fedor Flinzer: Der Deutsche Michel. Leipzig 1892.
- Allotria. Leipzig 1893.
- Das lustige Jena. Leipzig 1895.
- Meine Lieben. Leipzig 1897.
- Balladen, Legenden, Schwänke. Leipzig 1898.
- with Lothar Meggendorfer: Der Verwandlungskünstler. Eßlingen 1899.
- Schnurrige Kerle und andere Humoresken. Leipzig 1900.
- Bunte Reihe. Leipzig 1900.
- Das lyrische Tagebuch des Leutnants von Versewitz. Volumes 1 to 3, Leipzig 1901 until 1905.
- Auerbachs Deutscher Kinderkalender. Leipzig von 1901 bis 1918.
- Allerlei Schnick-Schnack. Leipzig 1905.
- with Fedor Flinzer: Spatz, Ente und Has´. Nürnberg 1904.
- Bismarck als Zensor. 1907.
- Heitere Stunden. 1909.
- with L. Otto: Alfranzerei und Allotria. without location and year
- Gedichte. edition grillenfänger, Udo Degener Verlag, Potsdam 2010, ISBN 978-3-940531-17-9.
