= Ellen Lenneck =

German novelist

Helene Weichardt's signature from her marriage certificate in 1879. Reproduced courtesy of Stadtarchiv Eisenach, Germany.

Ellen Lenneck was the writing pseudonym of Martha Julie Antoinette Helene Weichardt (1851–1880), a German author of novels and novellas. She was the only known daughter of novelist and literary editor Friederike Henkel, and a descendant from a family of industrialists and artists from Kassel and the Hesse region of Germany.

== Life and achievements ==
Portrait of Helene Weichardt's mother, Friederike Henkel. Painted by Carl Johann Arnold, 1850s.

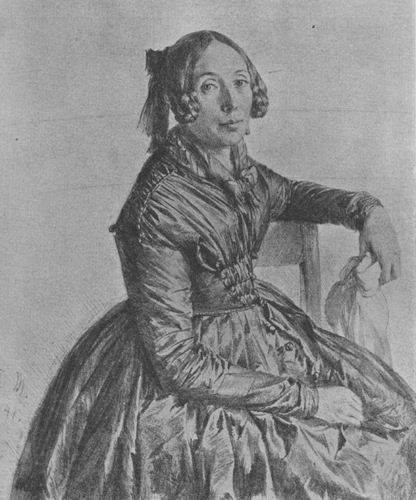
Portrait of Helene Weichardt's grandmother, Antonie Arnold. Pencil drawing by Adolph Menzel, c 1841.

=== Family background ===
Weichardt was born in Kassel Germany on 5 February 1851 into a family who had strong social connections within the developing industrialised German society of the early 19th century. They represented a vibrant combination of industrial, social and creative tendencies. This pattern of industrial skills, together with artistic abilities were personified in a number of Weichardt's family, including her husband Carl Weichardt de:Karl Weichardt (an architect and artist who participated in the building of The Reichstag in Berlin and also designed the Eisenach Theatre (Thüringer Landestheater Eisenach), her mother Friederike Henkel, born Friederike Arnold (writer of several novels, short stories and later a literary editor, who had lived in the same city as The Brothers Grimm), her uncle Carl Johann Arnold (the royal count painter tutored by Adolph Menzel), her grandfather Carl Heinrich Arnold (a wallpaper designer and artist associated with his business-skilled brother), her grandmother Antonie Arnold, born Antonie Reuter (a singer and actress at the Kassel Theatre), and their close family friend, the German artist Adolph Menzel, whose painting Portrait of Friederike Arnold in 1845 has been on public display at the National Gallery Berlin for over a century.

=== Early life and personal development ===
There is very little information available concerning Weichardt. Her adult life was relatively short since she died at the age of twenty-nine. Her abilities in literature and music were commented upon by literary editors during the late 19th and early 20th centuries. Her initial interest in music developed when she was a child living in Kassel with her parents. Her grandmother was a singer and actress at the Kassel Theatre, near to where her mother grew up. Later, her interest in literature was attributed to the city of Bern Switzerland, where she lived when her family moved there, due to her father's employment in Bern.

=== Literary works ===
During the 1870s, Weichardt wrote several fictional works, which were published either as separate novels, or in serial format within weekly journals including Deutsche Roman Zeitung and Deutsche Roman-Bibliothek, later re-printed within the publishing houses' year books. One literary work was published in Deutsche Roman-Bibliothek in 1882, after her death. Other literary works (other than those stated in her bibliography, below) were mentioned without name in the German literature lexicons by Franz Brümmer and Heinrich Gross.

== Death ==
Weichardt died on Sunday 16 May 1880 at 8 o'clock in the evening, only six months after her marriage. There is an absence of information about the cause of her death. There is also ambiguity about the place of her death. Her death announcement implies that her husband wrote it on 18 May 1880 in Görbersdorf. In 1880, there were two locations in Germany by this name. One is situated at the South-eastern boundary of Oederan Germany, and the other location in Germany was renamed Sokołowsko when it became part of Poland in 1945.

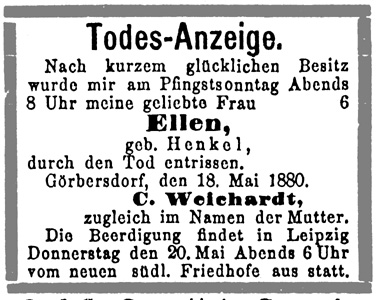
Helene Weichardt's death announcement in the Eisenacher Zeitung newspaper published on 20 May 1880, written by her husband and mother. Reproduced courtesy of Stadtarchiv Eisenach, Germany.

The evidence from the death announcement and entries in German literature lexicons do not clarify in which location she died. Görbersdorf near to Oederan is a small settlement about 1 km long, and has changed little since 1880. Sokołowsko was the location of a sanatorium for treating patients with chronic lung disorders, including Tuberculosis.

Weichardt was buried at the new southern cemeteries (neuen südl. Friedhofe aus statt) in Leipzig on 20 May 1880 at 6 o'clock in the evening. The Leipzig Stadtarchiv has clarified that this reference from the death announcement implies that she was buried at the Neuen Johannisfriedhof in Leipzig, which was converted into the Friedenspark in 1970. No graves remain in the park apart from some masonry from tombs relocated to the South-Eastern boundary and headstones set into the wall at the Northern gatehouse.

== Restoration and re-publication of literary works ==
A research project based in Berlin between 2004 and 2012 researched the life and achievements of Weichardt and Friederike Henkel. The project acquired copies of all the authors' literary works mentioned in literature lexicons (see bibliography), and compiled digital scans as public domain e-texts.

== Selected works ==
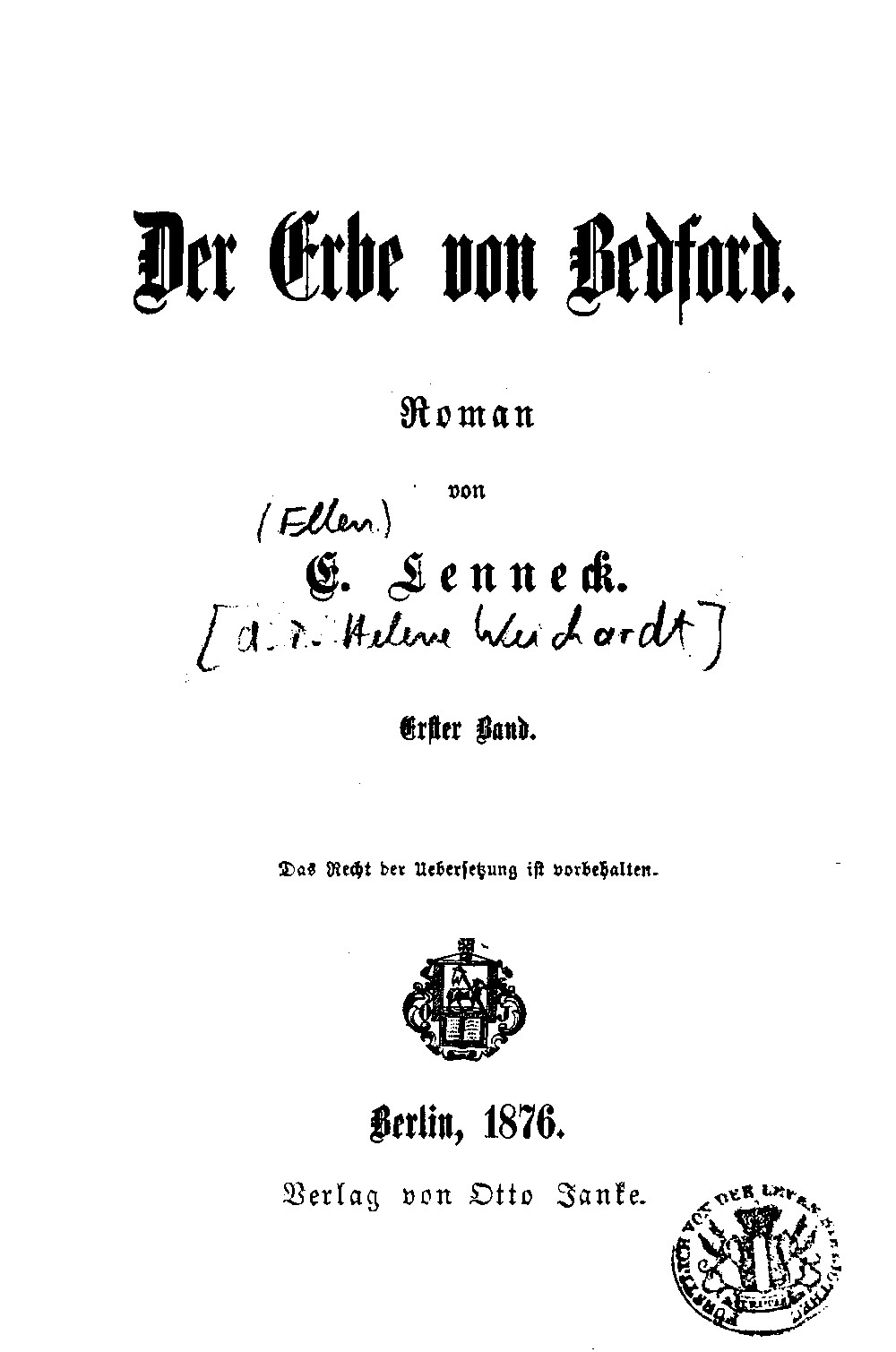
The title page from volume one of Helene Weichardt's novel Der Erbe von Bedford, published in 1876.

Novels and novellas

- Der Erbe von Bedford.
  - Novel, 4 volumes published in two editions, Publisher Otto Janke, Berlin, 1876.
  - Also as a serialised novel published in Deutsche Roman-Zeitung, volumes 2 and 3, Printer and Publisher Otto Janke, 1875.
  - Published Under pseudonym E. Lenneck.
- Das Fräulein von Eppingheim.
  - Deutsche Roman-Bibliothek zu Ueber Land und Meer, annual edition 5, volume 2, published by F.W. Hackländer, Press and Publishing House of Edward Hallberger, Stuttgart, pages 780–786, 805–824, 832–848, 857–872, 882–896, 905–924, 935–948, 957–972, 982–996, 1010–1020, 1030–1048, 1058–1072, 1081–1087.
  - 3 volumes, Stuttgart and Leipzig 1878. 2nd edition, Stuttgart 1880.
  - Published Under pseudonym E. Lenneck
- Abendsonne.
  - Deutsche Roman-Bibliothek zu Ueber Land und Meer, annual edition 10, volume 2, Press and Publishing House of the German Publisher's Institution (formerly Edward Hallberger), Stuttgart and Leipzig, 1882.
  - Published Under pseudonym E. Lenneck
- Luckhardt und Söhne.
  - (See Heinrich Gross).

== Notes ==
- Key to German-English Translation of Terms Used in Reference Sources:
  - Bd., Band means volume
  - Bde., Bänden means volumes
  - Aufl., Auflage means edition
  - Jahrg., Jahrgang means year (i.e., annual volume(s))
  - Deutsche Verlags-Anstalt means German Publishing House-Institute
- Deutsche Roman-Bibliothek zu Ueber Land und Meer was published twice annually, and consisted of two volumes each year. The date of the annual publication can be determined by considering that 1873 was the first year of publication. Bibliographical reference sources sometimes make an error of assumption about determining the date of volumes in this publication, often in error by one year.

== Sources ==
- Otto, Astrid, Schriftenreihe Des Archivs Der Deutschen Frauenbewegung, Band 7: Schreibende Frauen des 19. Jahrhunderts in Kassel und Nordhessen, Lebensläufe und Bibliographien (1756 - 1943) 1990, ISSN 0930-4444, ISBN 3-926068-07-8, page 202.
- Brümmer, Franz, Lexikon 19 Jahrhunderts, Volumes 7 and 8, page 356.
- Gros, Heinrich, Deutschlands Dichterinnen und Schriftstellerinnen: Eine literarhistorische Skizze, Publisher C. Gerold's Sohn, Vienna 1882, Page 261. Reference for Ellen Lenneck.
- Pataky, Sophie, Lexikon deutscher Frauen, Berlin, 1898, volume 1, page 492.
