= Melitta Otto-Alvsleben =

German operatic soprano (1842–1893)

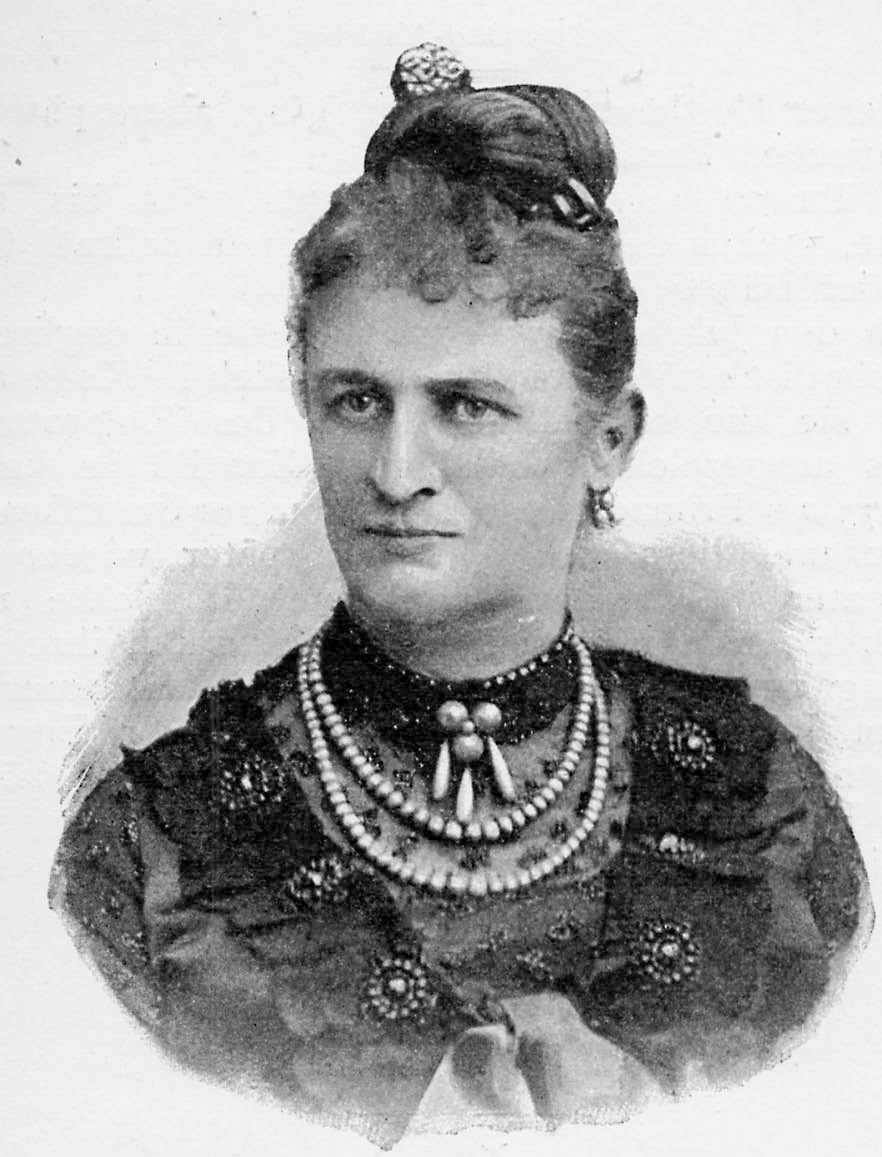
Melitta Otto-Alvsleben

Henriette Melitta Otto-Alvsleben, also Melita Alvsleben, (16 December 1842 – 13 January 1893) was a German operatic soprano and voice teacher.

== Life ==
Born in Dresden, Otto-Alvsleben began a three-year apprenticeship (1856 to the end of March 1860) at the age of 14, first as a pianist, then as a singer at the Dresden conservatory.

After graduating, she made her debut on 29 March 1860, at first against the resistance of the general director of the opera Wolf Adolf August von Lüttichau, who considered her unsuitable and initially refused her ten auditions. Nevertheless, her patron Julius Pabst succeeded in getting her into an audition, whereupon she was employed by Lüttichau for 400 thaler per year.

She remained in Dresden as lyric and coloratura soprano until 1873 employed at the Königliches Hoftheater Dresden. Her annual salary quickly rose to 600, 1200 and 1800 thalers.

In 1866, she married Max Otto, who later became a senior customs officer.

Alvsleben took part in the world premiere of the opera Der Haideschacht by Franz von Holstein in Dresden on 24 October 1868. As a concert singer, she gave, for example, the soprano solo in the 9th Symphony at the Centenary Celebration 1871 in Bonn, postponed for a year because of the Franco-Prussian War.

She made her foreign debut in London in 1873, accompanying the pianist Clara Schumann in a concert at St James's Hall. Due to the great success of Bach's St Matthew Passion in Manchester that same year, she was one of the most sought-after oratorio soloists in England and Scotland for the next two years. She gave notable concerts at the Royal Albert Hall as well as the Crystal Palace in London, and at the 1874 Leeds Festival.

In 1875, Otto-Alvsleben was appointed prima donna at the Hamburg State Opera. In 1877, she returned to the Dresden Court Opera, where she worked until her stage retirement in 1883. In 1879, Otto-Alvsleben performed at the Cincinnati music festival. She was made an honorary member of the Dresden Opera House in 1879 or 1883. After her retirement, she worked only as a concert and oratorio singer and as a singing teacher.

She spent her summers in the Oberlößnitz, where she had a flat. After her death, Alvslebenplatz near her flat was named after her. This was a tribute by the Verschönerungsverein für die Lößnitz (Beautification Association for the Lößnitz), as she had helped it to generate financial income for its charitable activities by participating in numerous benefit concerts.

Called the Friedrichstädter Nachtigall (Friedrichstadt Nightingale), Otto-Alvsleben died in 1893 in Dresden aged 50 and was buried in the Innerer Neustädter Friedhof.

== Roles (selection) ==
- Anna in Hans Heiling by Heinrich Marschner
- Rowena in Der Templer und die Jüdin by Heinrich Marschner
- Queen of the Night in the Magic Flute by W. A. Mozart
- Martha in Martha by Friedrich von Flotow
- Alice in Robert le diable by Giacomo Meyerbeer
- Eva in Die Meistersinger von Nürnberg by Richard Wagner
