= Friedenspark =

Cemetery in Leipzig, Germany

Coordinates: 51°19′39″N 12°23′41″E

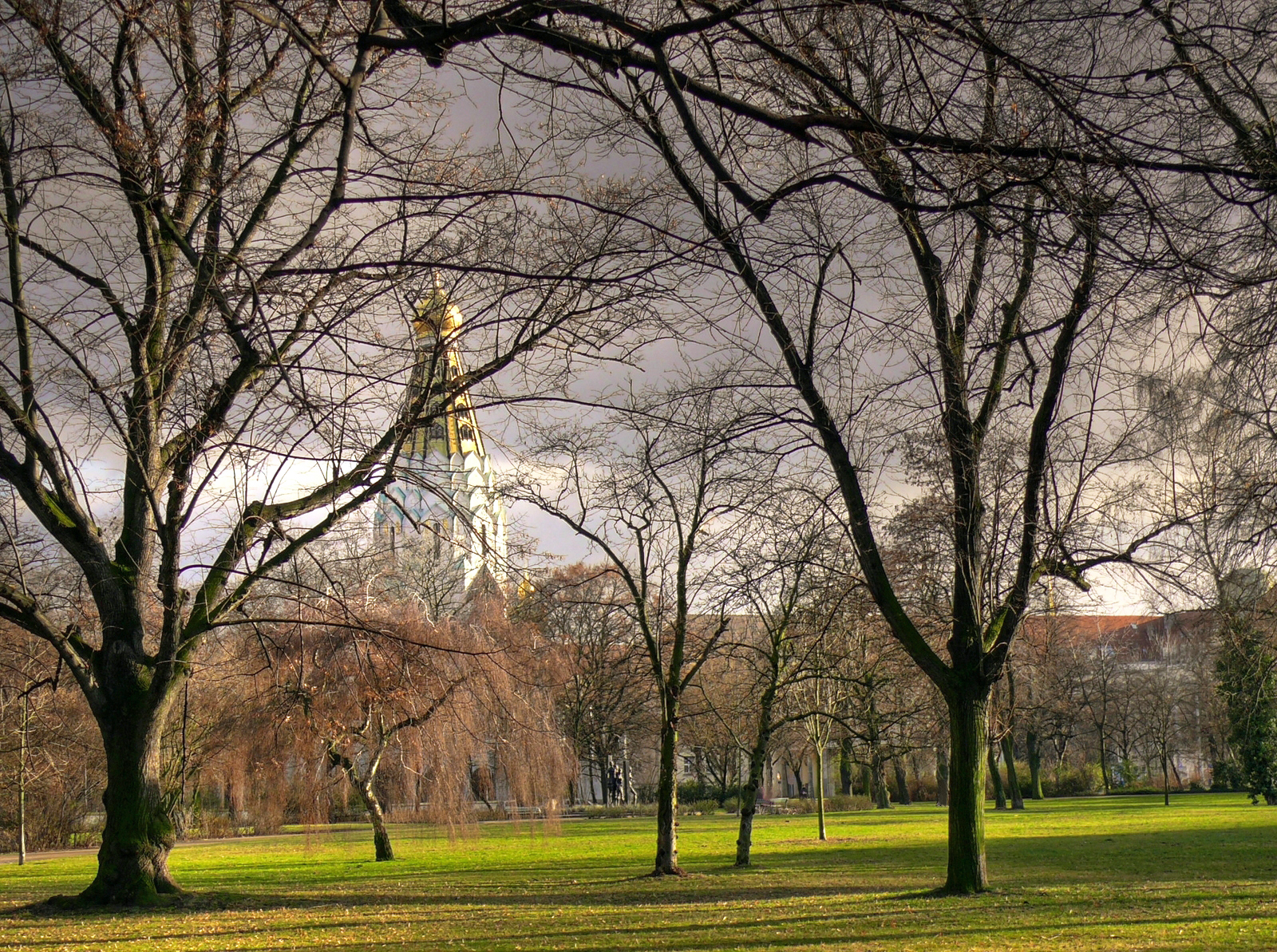
- Friedenspark in 2008, with the Russian Memorial Church in the background
- Interactive map of Friedenspark
- Type: Urban park
- Location: Leipzig, Saxony, Germany
- Area: 20 ha (49 acres)
- Created: 1983
- Open: all year round

The Friedenspark ("Peace Park") is an open space of about 20 hectares in the centre of Leipzig, in the district of Zentrum-Südost, located between the Ostplatz to the north and the Russian Memorial Church (Russische Gedächtniskirche) to the south. The park was opened in 1983, after the secularisation and clearance, under the then East German regime, of the Neuer Johannisfriedhof ("New St. John's Cemetery"), which is what the space used to be, and its thorough reconstruction.

== Neuer Johannisfriedhof ==
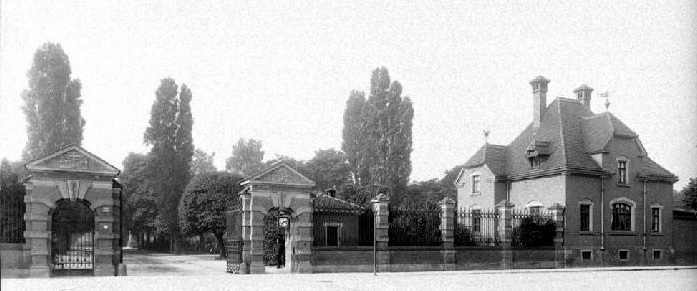
The cemetery entrance in about 1900

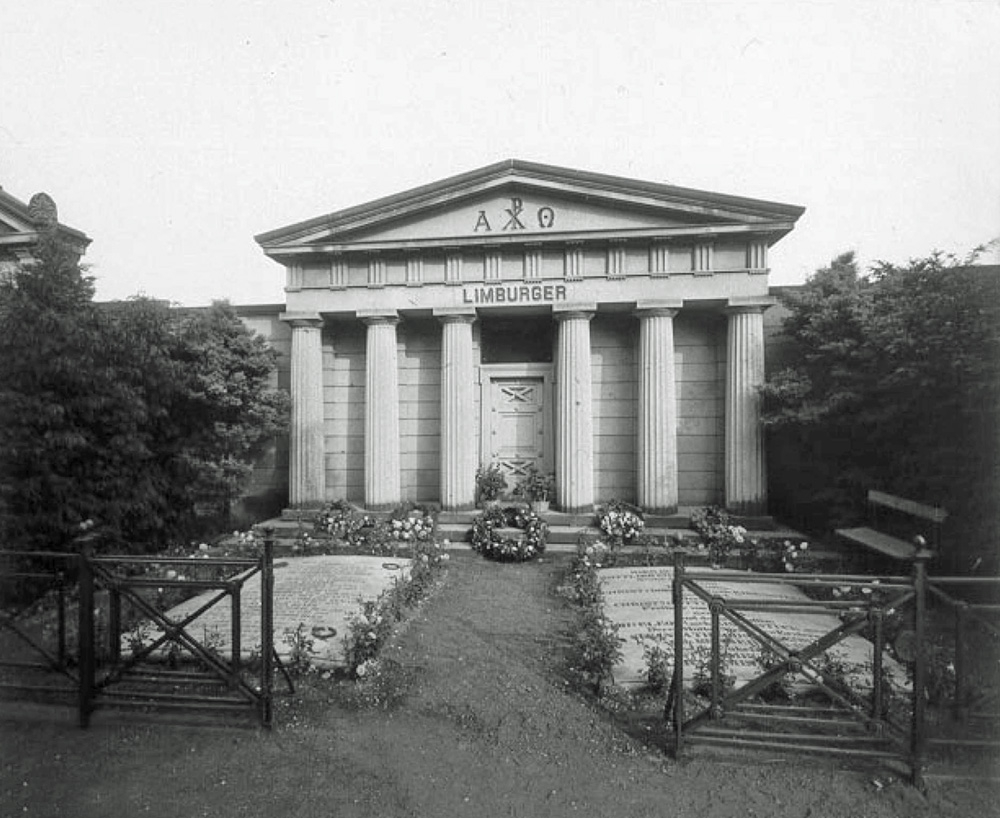
Mausoleum of the von Limburger family, Neuer Johannisfriedhof, 1902

The site of the Friedenspark used to be occupied by the Neuer Johannisfriedhof, which was opened as the second city cemetery of Leipzig in 1846, after it had proved impossible to enlarge the old cemetery, the Alter Johannisfriedhof, any further. The designs for the chapel and mortuary, built between 1881 and 1884, were by Hugo Licht (1841–1923). They were destroyed in World War II. During the time of the National Socialist government the remains of more than a hundred children from the Paediatrics Department of the Dösen Asylum were buried anonymously in urns in sections V 2, 3 and 5, victims of the then child euthanasia policy.

On 31 December 1950 the Neuer Johannisfriedhof was closed to further burials, but remained accessible to the public up to 31 December 1970. From 1973 to 1975 the cemetery was secularised: vaults were removed, graves cleared and levelled. About 120 monuments and gravestones of civic or art-historical significance were taken to the Alter Johannisfriedhof and kept in the open air. A combination of damage during transit, theft and vandalism meant that by the early 1990s only 58 monuments remained. These were restored, and erected in the south-east of the Alter Johannisfriedhof.

=== Burials of notable people ===
The locations of these burials, thanks to the clearance of the cemetery, are no longer traceable, and as above most monuments have not survived.

- Wilhelm Eduard Albrecht (1800–1876), lawyer
- Ernst Anschütz (1780–1861), composer
- Adolph Ambrosius Barth (1827–1869), publisher and bookseller
- Paul Barth (1858–1922), philosopher and sociologist
- Gustav Baur (1816–1889), theologian
- Adolf Blomeyer (1830–1889), agronomist
- Julius Blüthner (1824–1910), piano builder
- Georg Bötticher (1849–1918), author, father of Joachim Ringelnatz
- Edwin Bormann (1851–1912), writer, scientist
- Friedrich Arnold Brockhaus (1772–1823), publisher
- Heinrich Brockhaus (1804–1874), publisher, Citizen of Honour of Leipzig
- Hermann Brockhaus (1806–1877), orientalist
- Clemens Brockhaus (1837–1877), theologian
- Lorenz Clasen (1812–1899), historical painter
- Julius Friedrich Cohnheim (1839-1884), pathologist
- Carl Hermann Credner (1842–1913), geologist
- Georg Curtius (1820–1885), philologist
- Johann Nepomuk Czermak (1828–1873), physiologist
- Ferdinand David (1810-1873), concert master of the Gewandhaus
- Otto Delitsch (1821–1882), geographer
- Rudolf Dietsch (1814–1875), philologist
- Hans Driesch (1867–1941), biologist
- Albert Dufour-Féronce (1798–1861), entrepreneur, railway pioneer
- Gustav Heinrich Duncker (????–1882), businessman
- Peter Dybwad (1859–1921), architect
- Friedrich August Eckstein (1810-1885), philologist and pedagogue
- Gustav Theodor Fechner (1801–1887), physicist and natural philosopher, Citizen of Honour of Leipzig
- Fedor Flinzer (1832–1911), illustrator
- Emil Albert Friedberg (1837–1910), jurist
- Hermann Traugott Fritzsche (1809–1887), businessman
- Hermann Traugott Fritzsche (Junior) (1843–1906), businessman
- Otto Hermann Fritzsche (1882–1906), pioneer of flight
- Hugo Gaudig (1860–1923), reforming pedagogue
- Gustav Friedrich Hänel (1792–1878), jurist
- Moritz Hauptmann (1792–1868), composer
- Carl Heine (1819–1888), entrepreneur, industry pioneer
- Wilhelm His (1831–1904), anatomist
- Franz von Holstein (1826–1878), composer
- Hermann Joseph (1811–1869), jurist and politician
- Julius Klinkhardt (1810–1881), publisher
- Otto Koch (1810–1876), politician and Bürgermeister, Citizen of Honour of Leipzig
- Karl Franz Koehler (1843–1897), publisher and bookseller
- Karl Krause (1823–1902), machine manufacturer
- Ernst Kroker (1859–1927), librarian and historian
- Albrecht Kurzwelly (1868–1917), art historian
- Carl Lampe (1804–1889), entrepreneur, railway pioneer, Citizen of Honour of Leipzig
- Paul Lange (1853–1932), architect
- Rudolf Leuckart (1822–1898), zoologist, Citizen of Honour of Leipzig
- Jacob Bernhard Limburger (1770–1847) and family, manufacturer of silk goods
- Carl Ludwig (1816–1895), physiologist, Citizen of Honour of Leipzig
- Anton Mädler (1864–1925), manufacturer of suitcases and patron of the arts
- Gotthard Oswald Marbach (1810–1890), philosopher, poet, director of insurance
- Hermann Masius (1818–1893), pedagogue and professor
- Wilhelm Maurenbrecher (1838–1892), German historian
- Ignaz Moscheles (1794–1870), composer and pianist
- Carl Otto Müller (1819–1898), jurist
- Friedrich Konrad Müller (1823–1881), poet
- Richard Müller (????–????), conductor
- Paul Möbius (1866–1907), architect
- Oscar Mothes (1828–1903), architect
- Carl Gottfried Neumann (1832–1925), mathematician
- Adam Friedrich Oeser (1717–1799), painter
- Louise Otto-Peters (1819–1895), writer and proponent of women's rights
- Johannes Overbeck (1826–1895), archaeologist
- Oscar Paul (1836–1898), musicologist
- Eduard Friedrich Poeppig (1798–1868), biologist
- Eduard Pötzsch (1803–1889), architect
- Anton Philipp Reclam (1807–1896) and family, publisher
- Rudolph Alexander Renkwitz (1828–1910), businessman and founder
- Friedrich Ritschl (1806–1876), philologist
- Wilhelm Roscher (1817–1894), national economist and historian, Citizen of Honour of Leipzig
- Arwed Rossbach (1844–1902), architect
- Emil Adolf Rossmässler (1805–1867), nature researcher
- Christian Hermann Schellenberg (1816–1862), organist at St. Nicolai
- Adolf Heinrich Schletter (1793–1853), businessman and founder (removed to the Südfriedhof)
- Auguste Schmidt (1833–1902), teacher and proponent of women's rights
- Moritz Schreber (1808–1861), doctor
- Paul Robert Schuster (1841–1877), theologian
- Willmar Schwabe (1839–1917), homeopath, chemist and manufacturer of medicines
- Friedrich Herman Semmig (1820–1897), writer, participant in the 1849 May Uprising in Dresden
- Anton Springer (1825–1891), art historian
- Melchior zur Strassen (1832–1896), sculptor
- Konrad Sturmhoefel (1858–1916), historian and pedagogue
- Benedictus Gotthelf Teubner (1784–1856) and family, publisher
- Carl Thiersch (1822–1895), physician
- Constantin von Tischendorf (1815–1874), theologian
- Carl Bruno Tröndlin (1835–1908), Oberbürgermeister of Leipzig
- Heinrich Gottlieb Tzschirner (1778–1828), theologian
- August Friedrich Viehweger (1836–1919), architect
- Johann Karl Christoph Vogel (1795–1862), pedagogue, Citizen of Honour of Leipzig
- Georg Voigt (1827–1891), German historian
- Johann Jacob Weber (1803–1880), publisher
- Bernhard Windscheid (1817–1892), legal academic, Citizen of Honour of Leipzig
- Käthe Windscheid (1859–1943), teacher and proponent of women's rights
- Gustav Wohlgemuth (1863–1937), choir conductor and composer
- Bruno Wollstädter (1878–1940), sculptor
- Gustav Wustmann (1844–1910), philologist and historian
- Heinrich Wuttke (1818−1876), German historian
- Friedrich Zarncke (1825–1891), Germanist
- Carl Friedrich Zöllner (1800–1860), composer

=== Transferred gravestones ===
Gravestones and monuments moved from the Neuer to the Alter Johannisfriedhof:

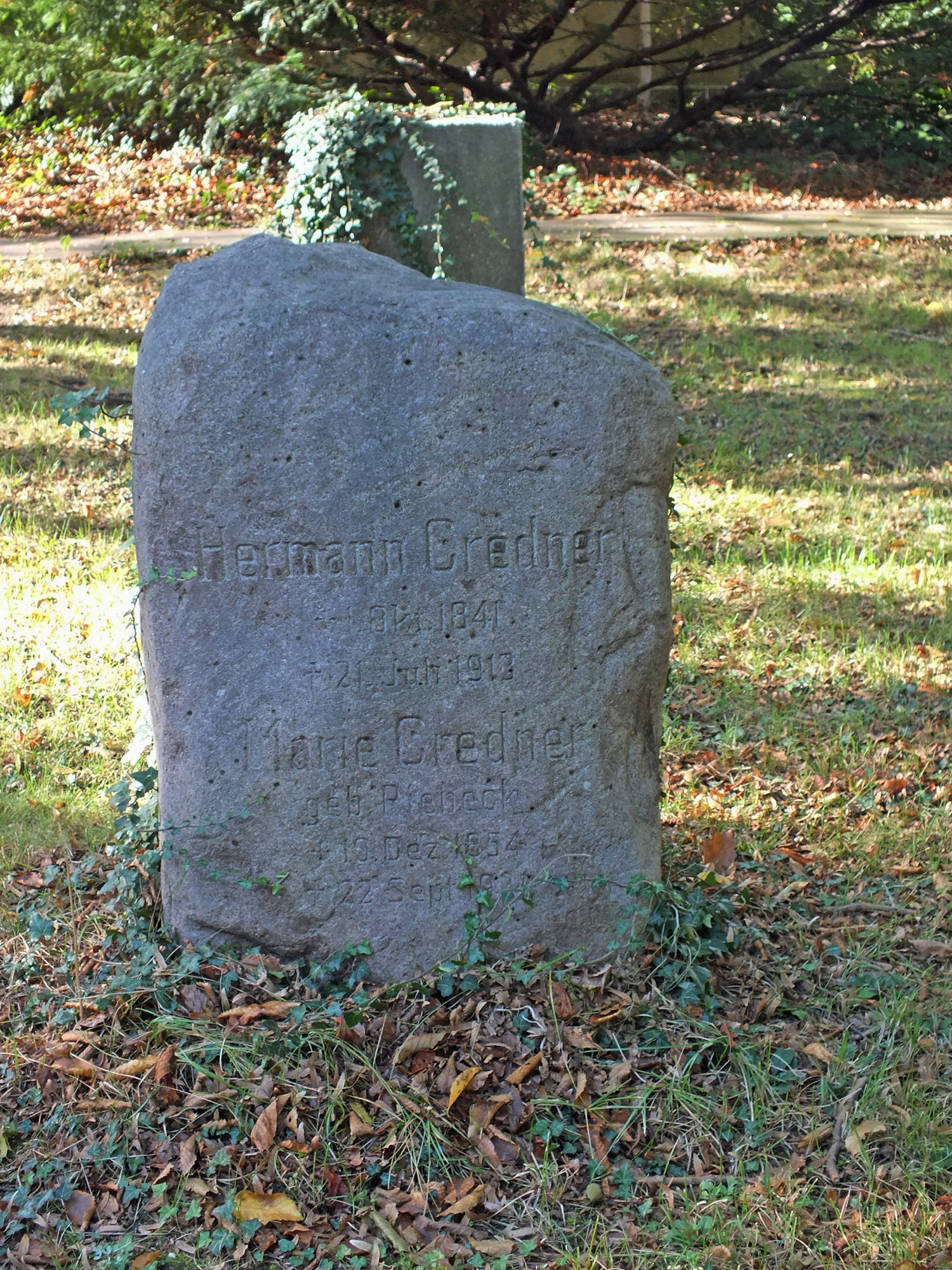
Hermann Credner

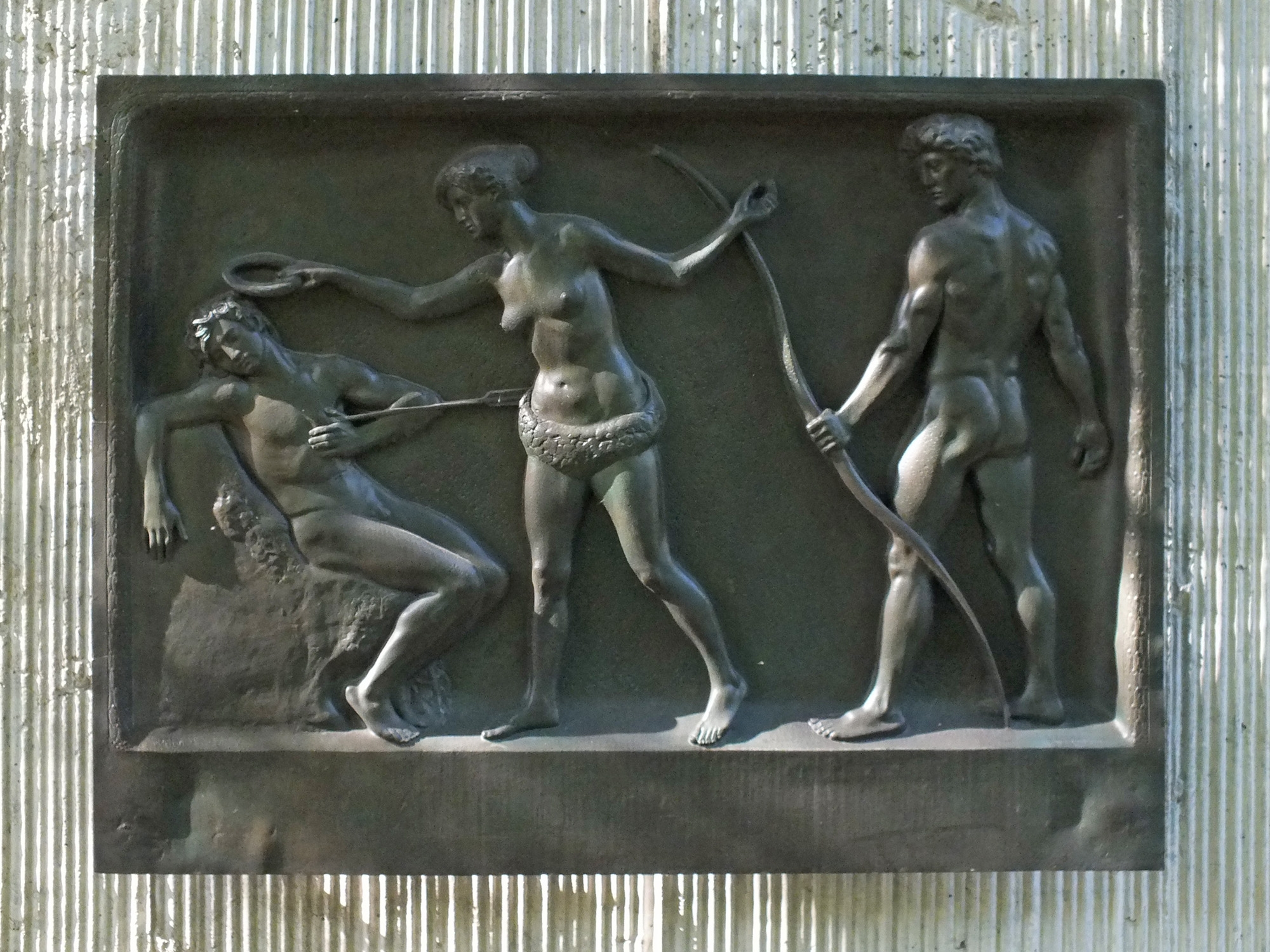
Carl Heine (bronze relief by Georg Wrba)

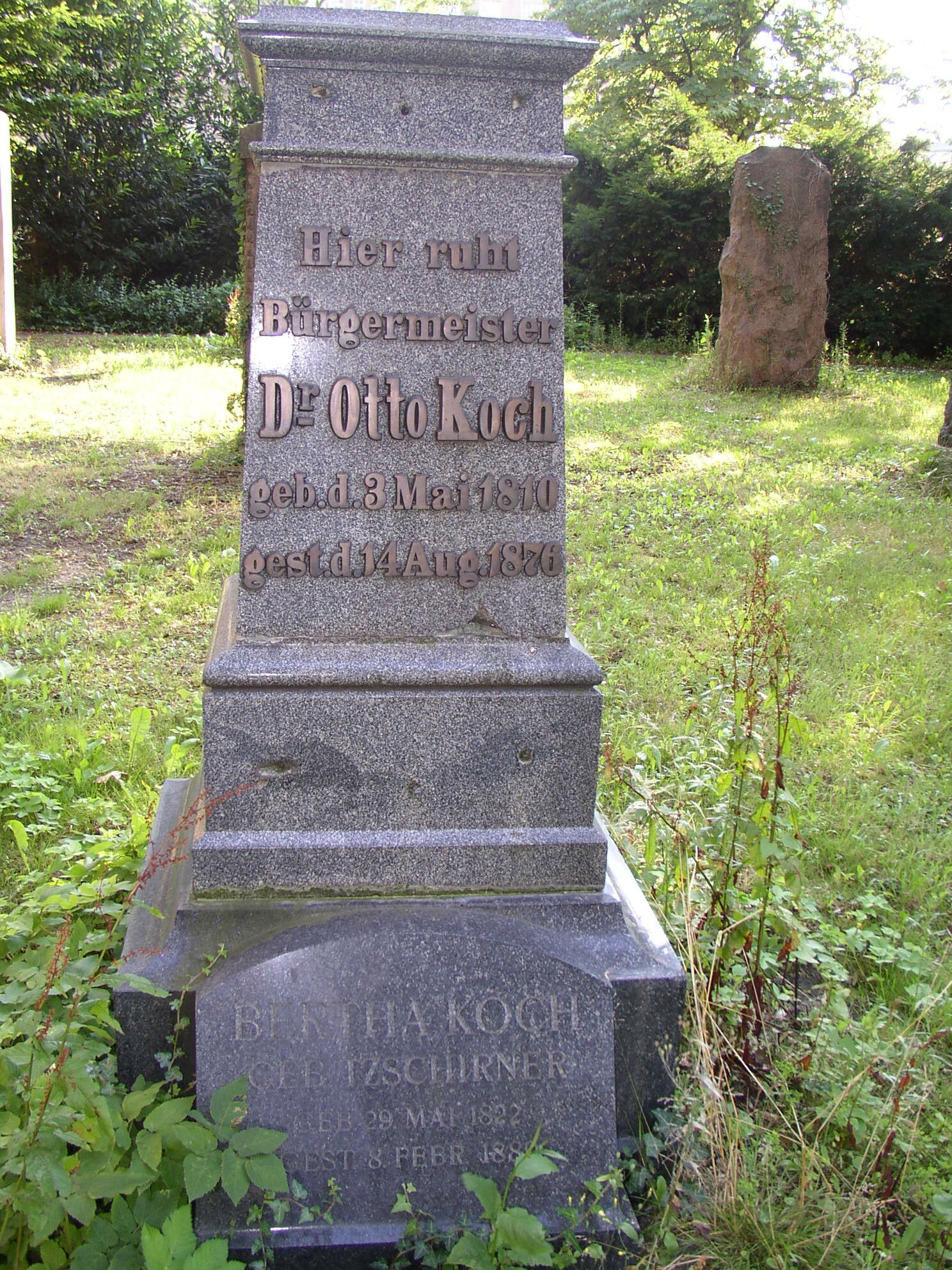
Otto Koch

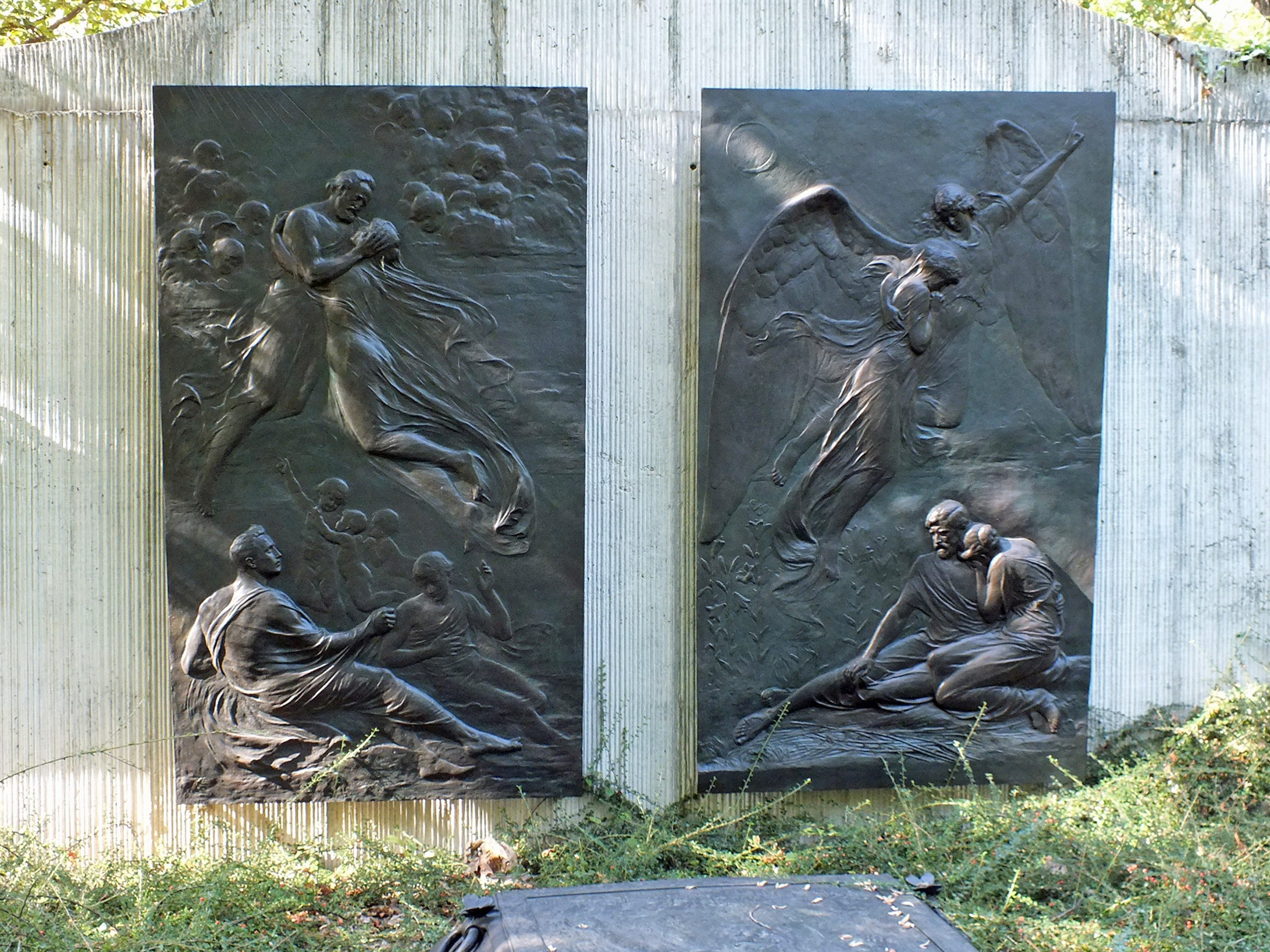
Karl Krause (bronze reliefs by Adolf Lehnert)

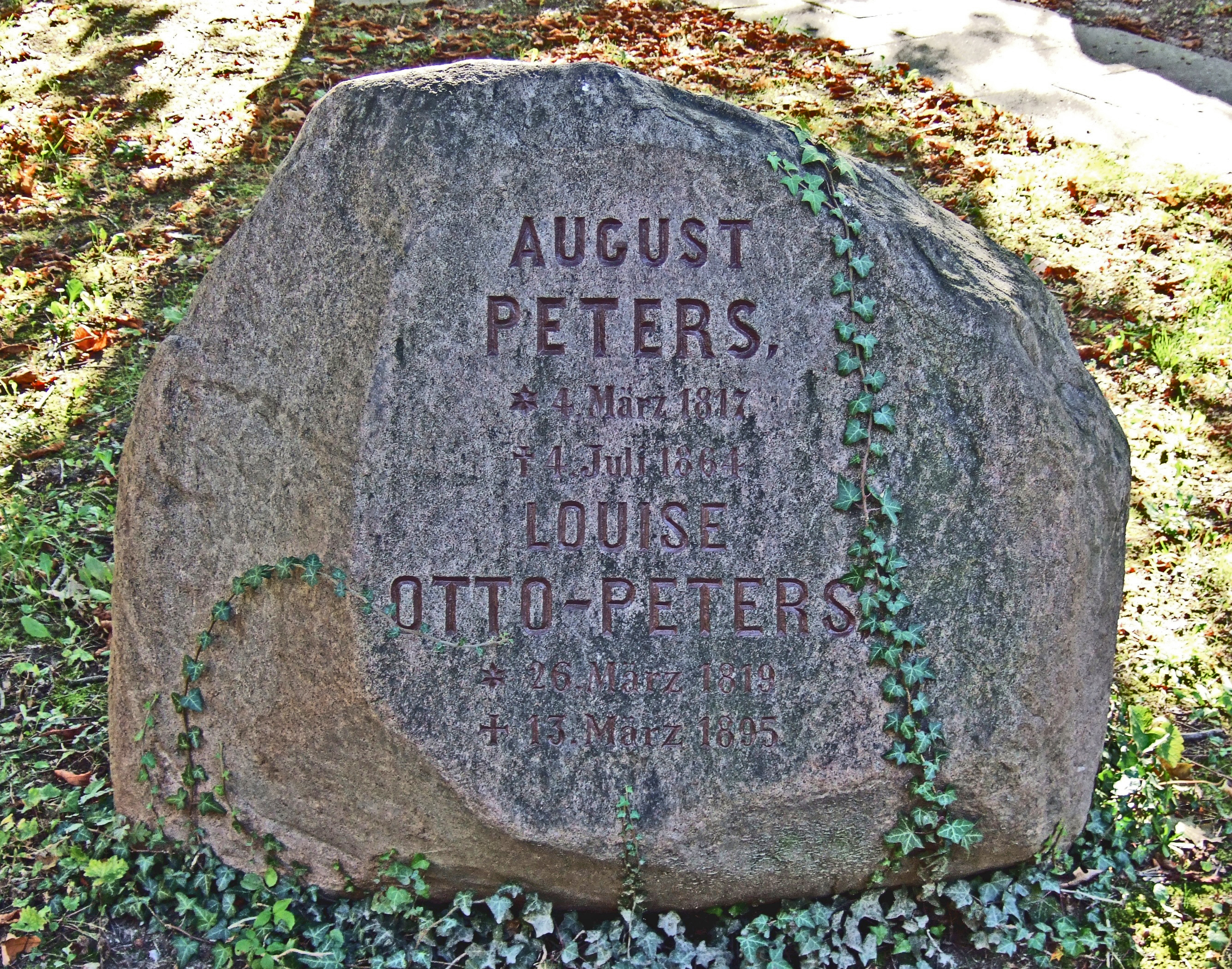
Louise Otto-Peters

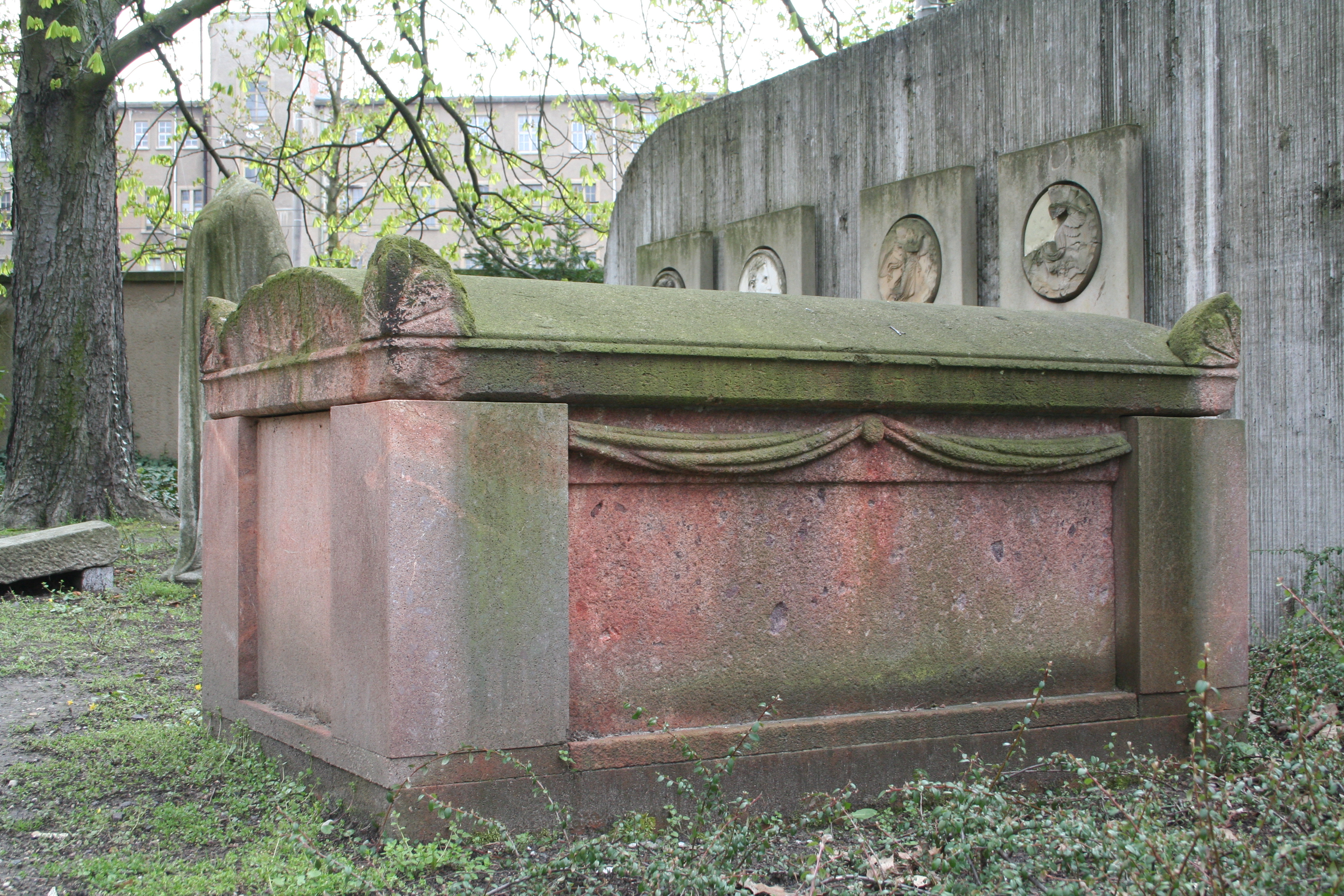
Anton Philipp Reclam

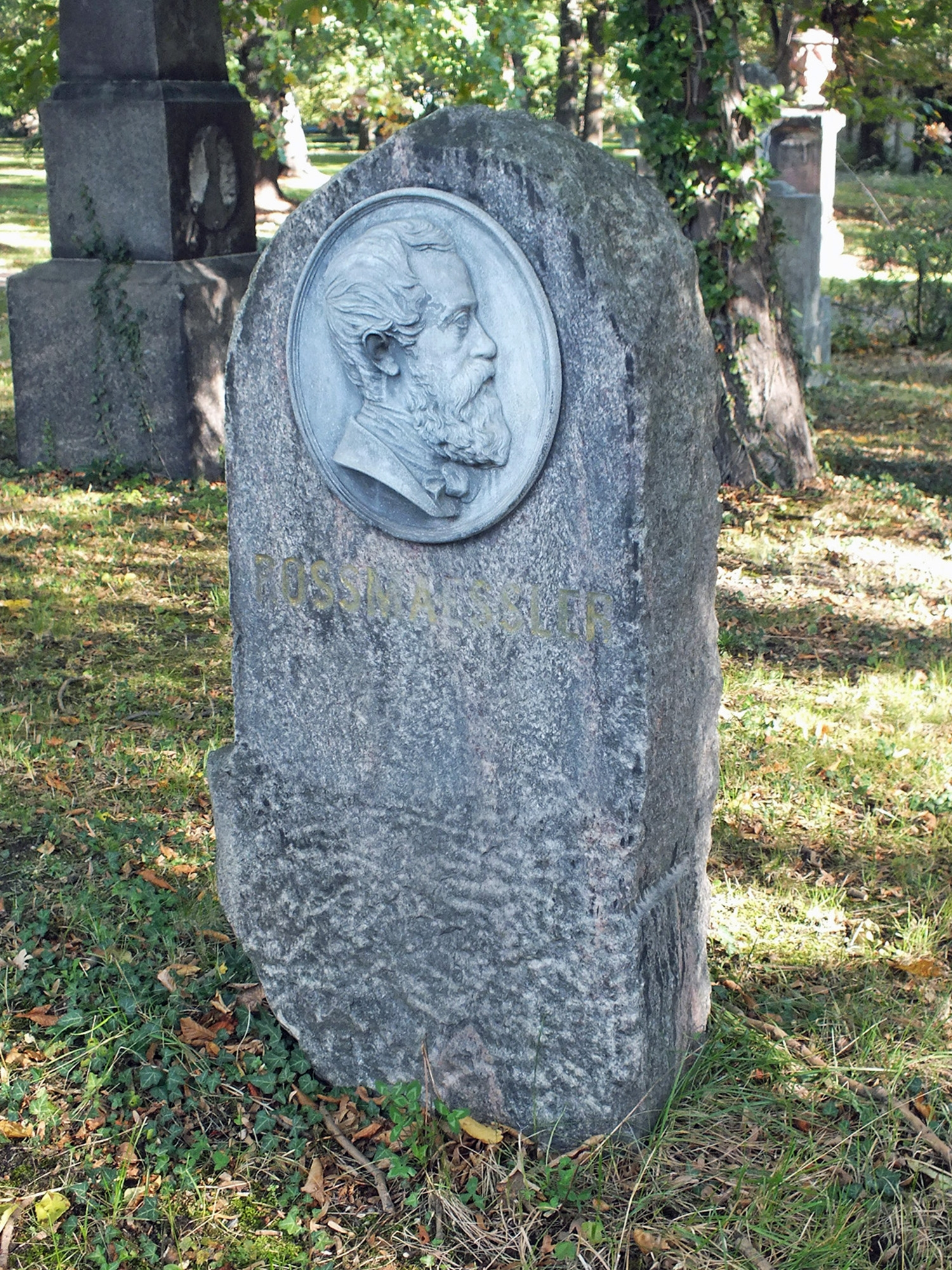
Emil Adolf Rossmässler

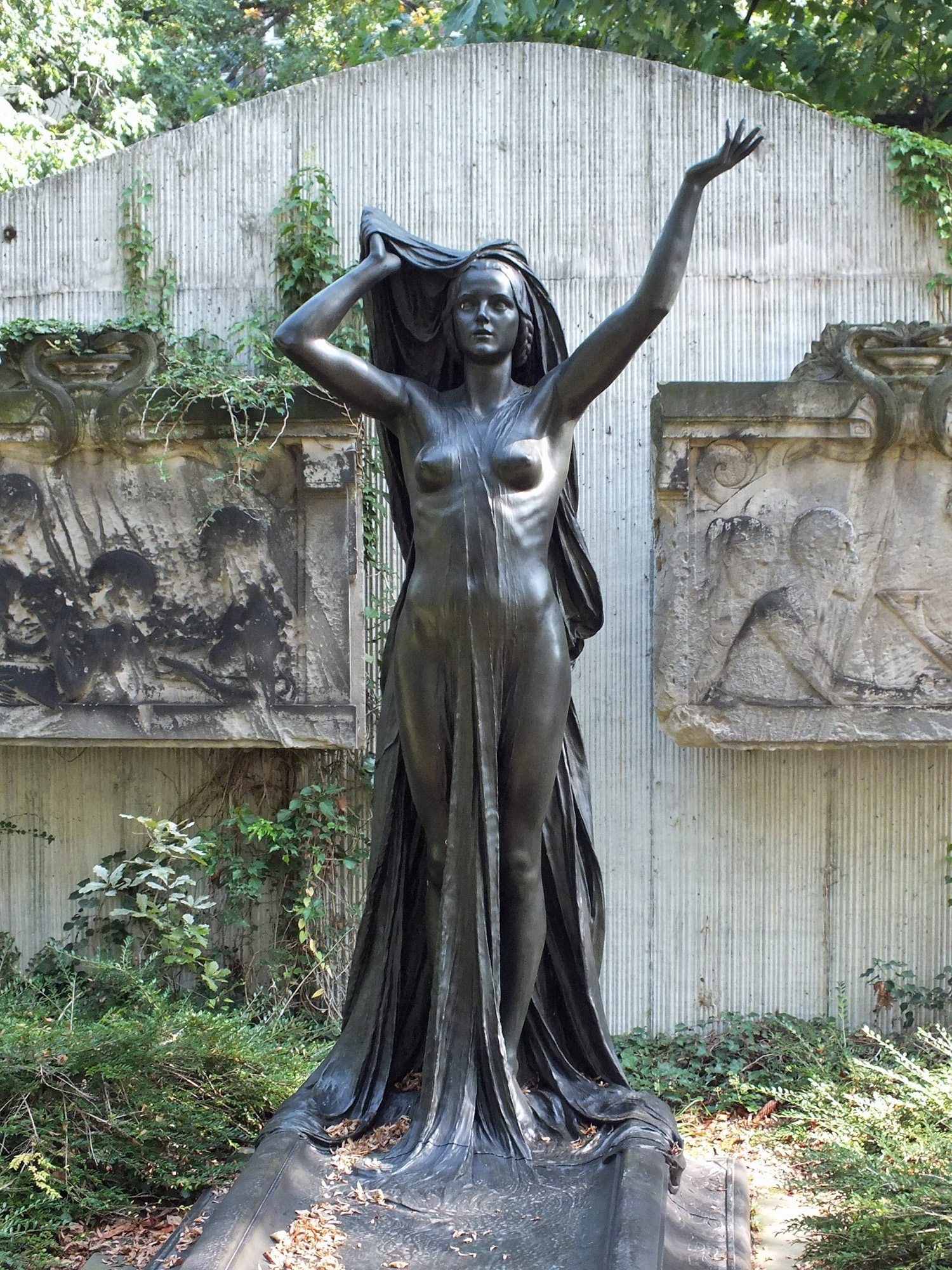
Willmar Schwabe (sculpture by Josef Mágr)

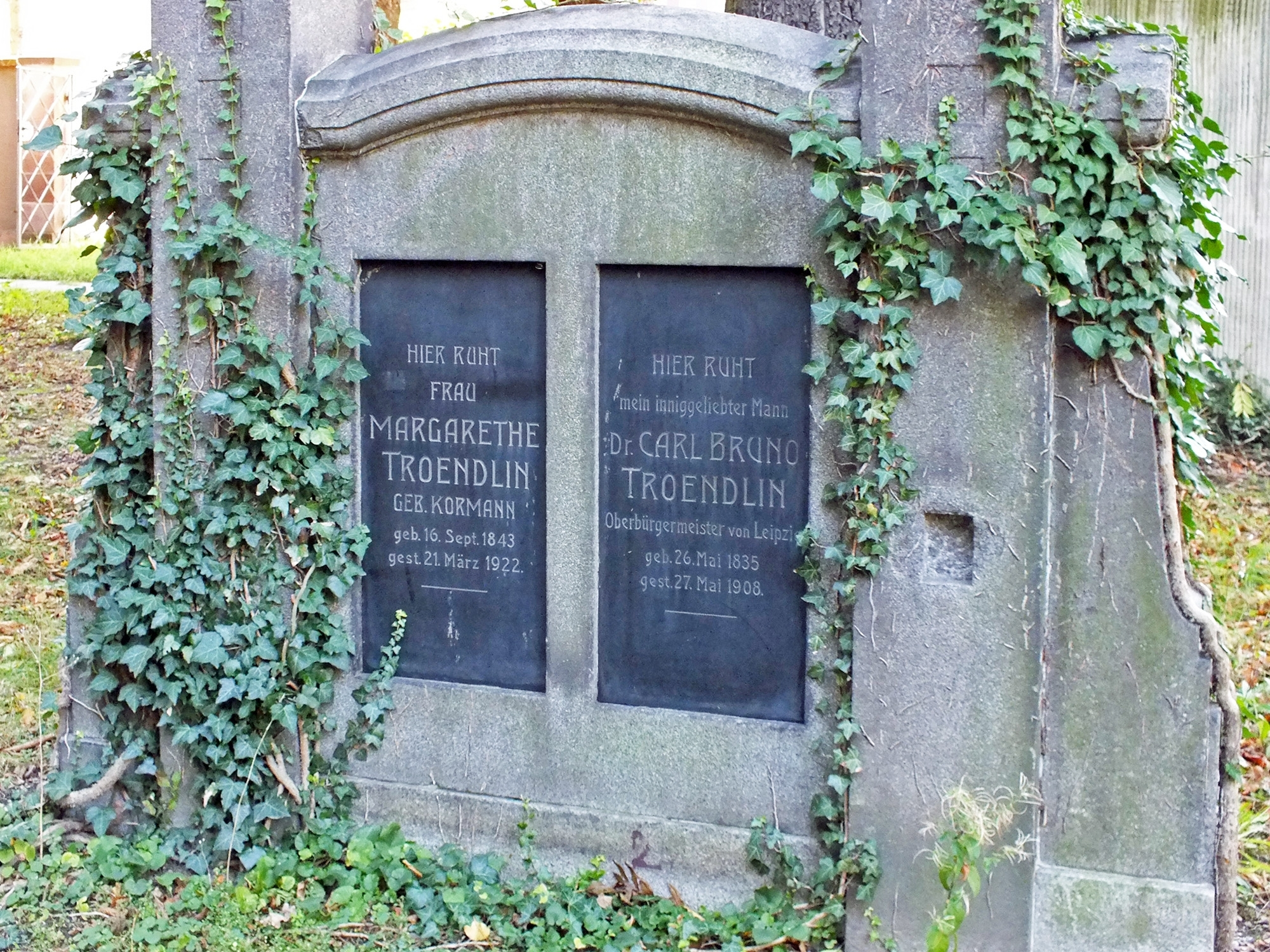
Carl Bruno Tröndlin

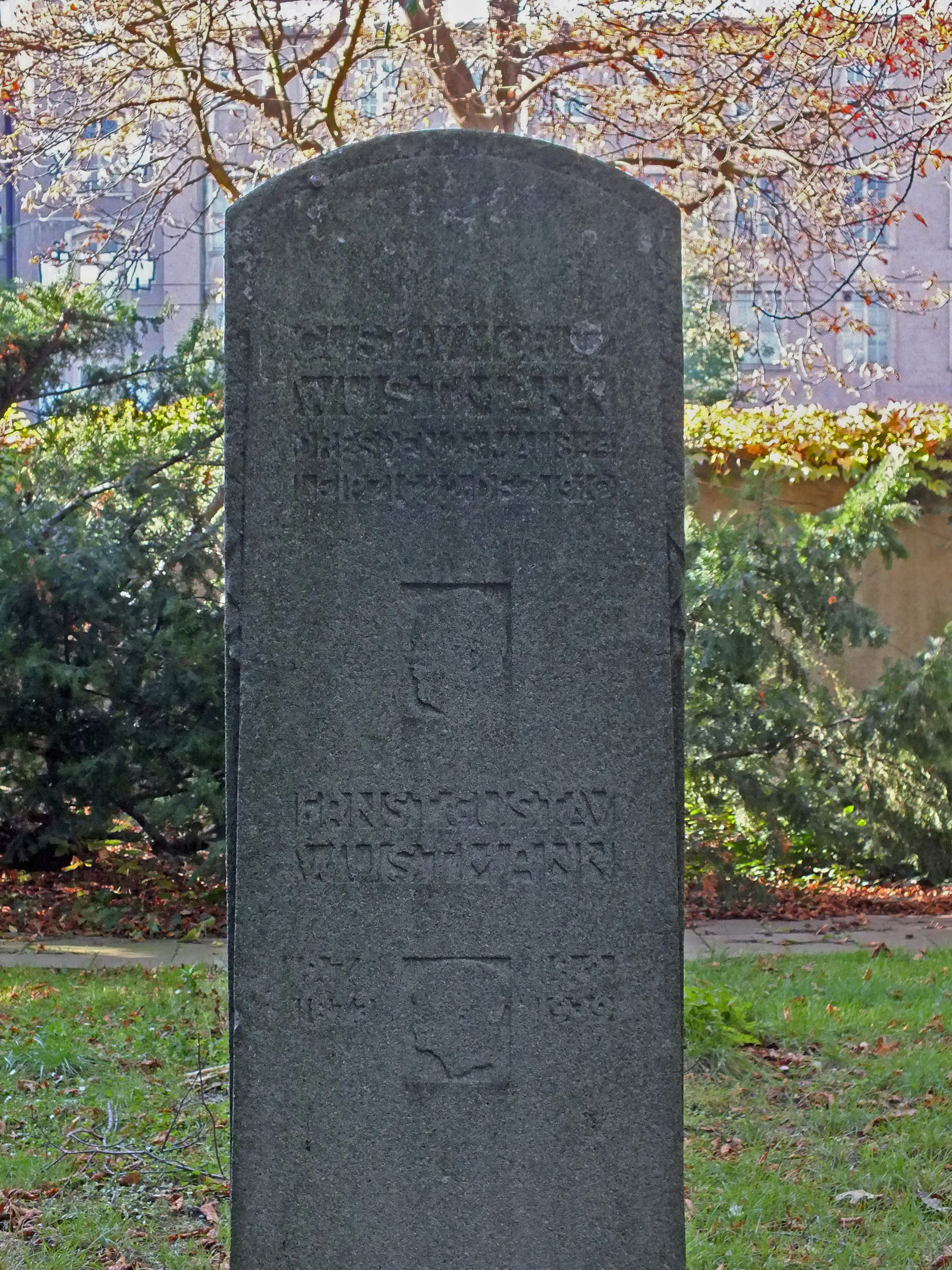
Gustav Wustmann

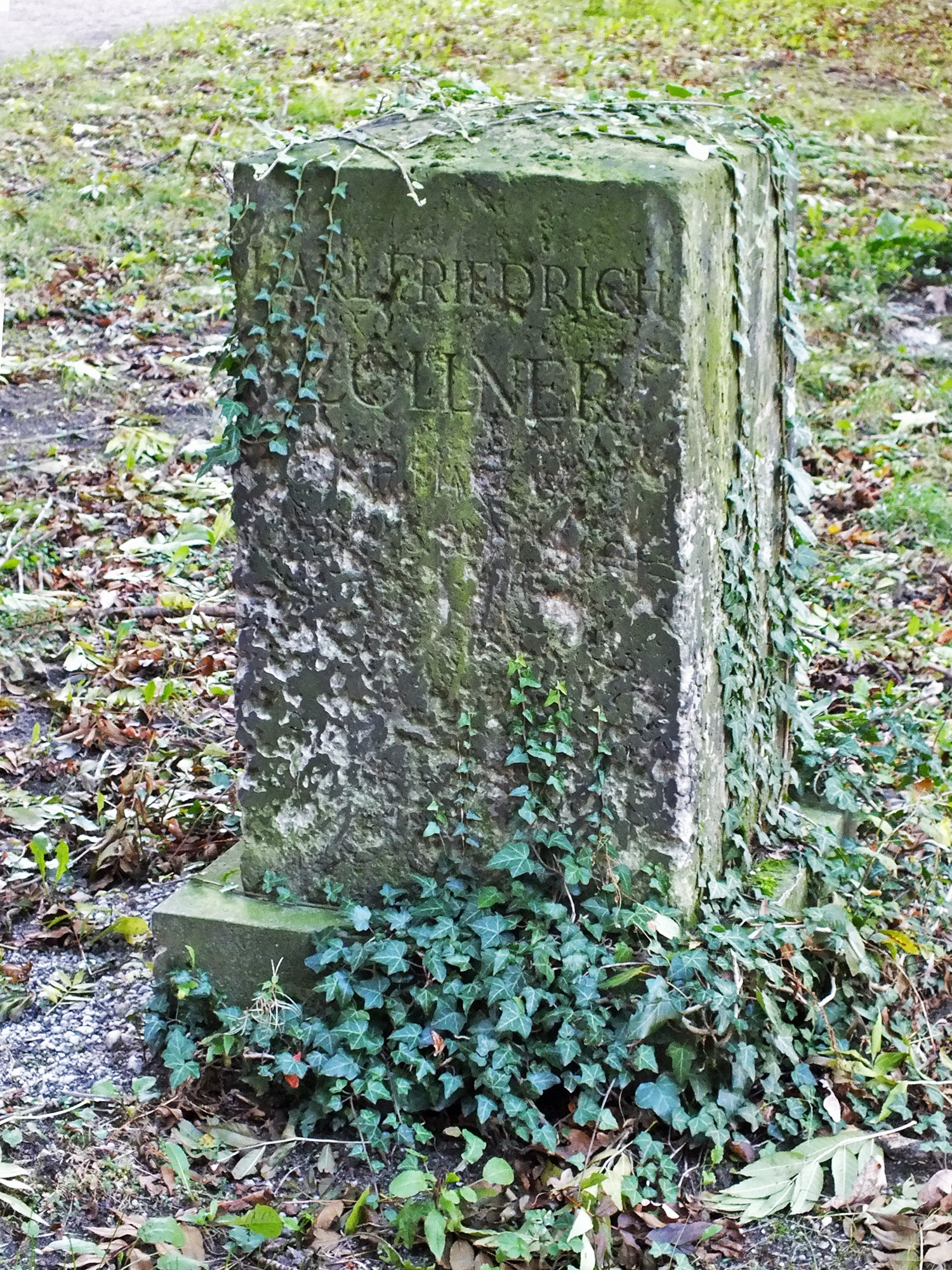
Carl Friedrich Zöllner

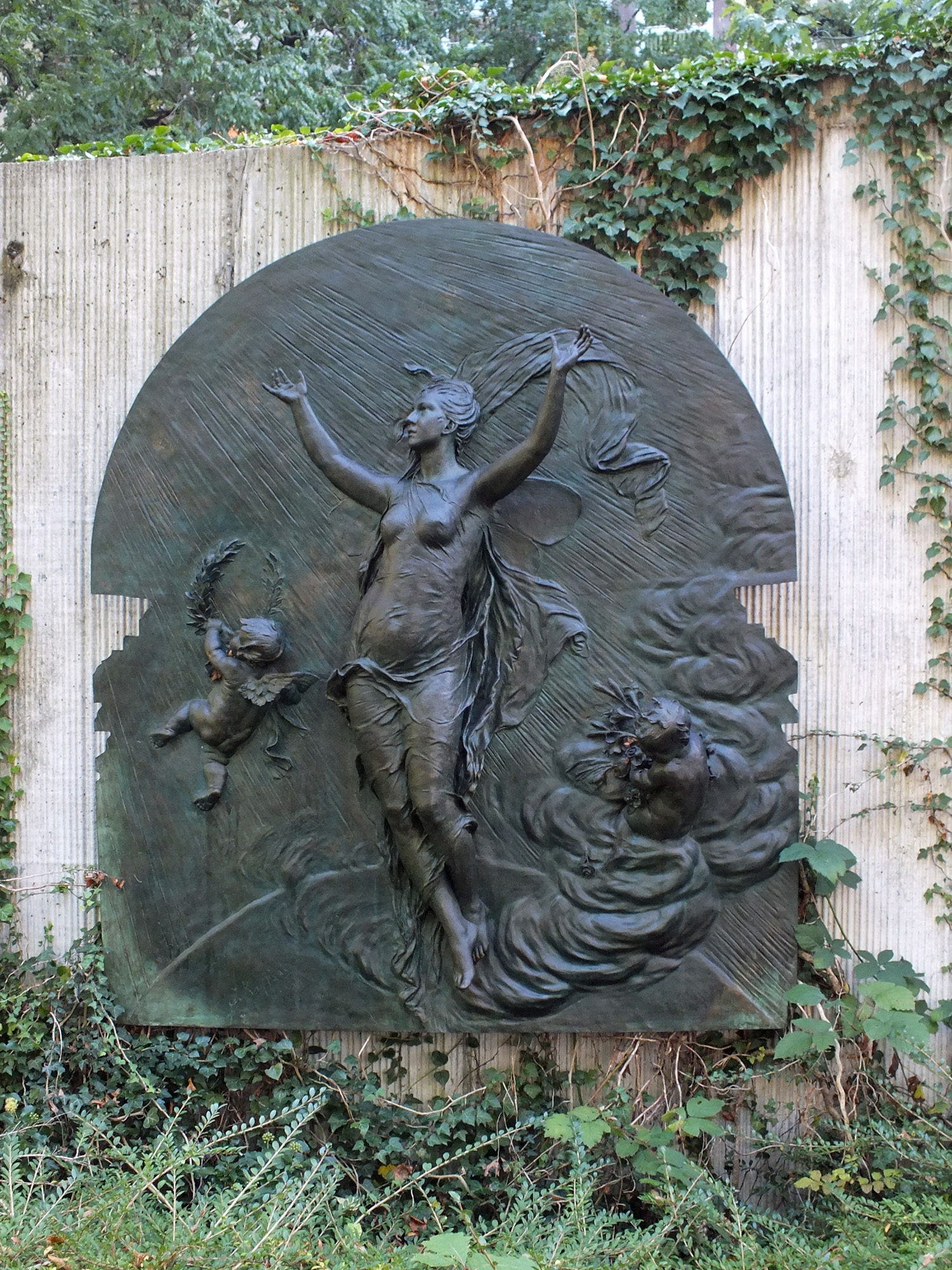
K.F.Koehler family (bronze relief by Joseph Kaffsack)

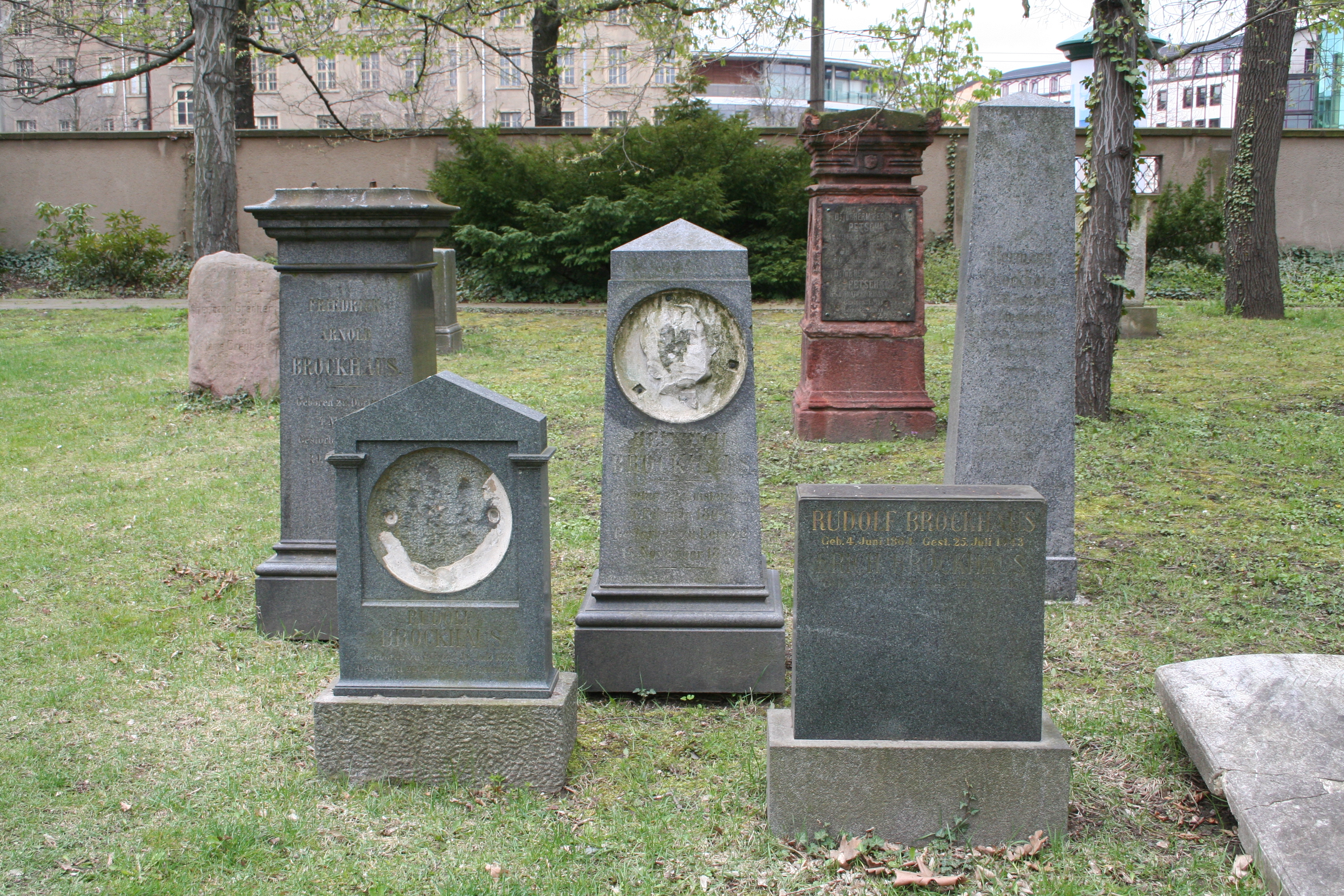
Brockhaus family

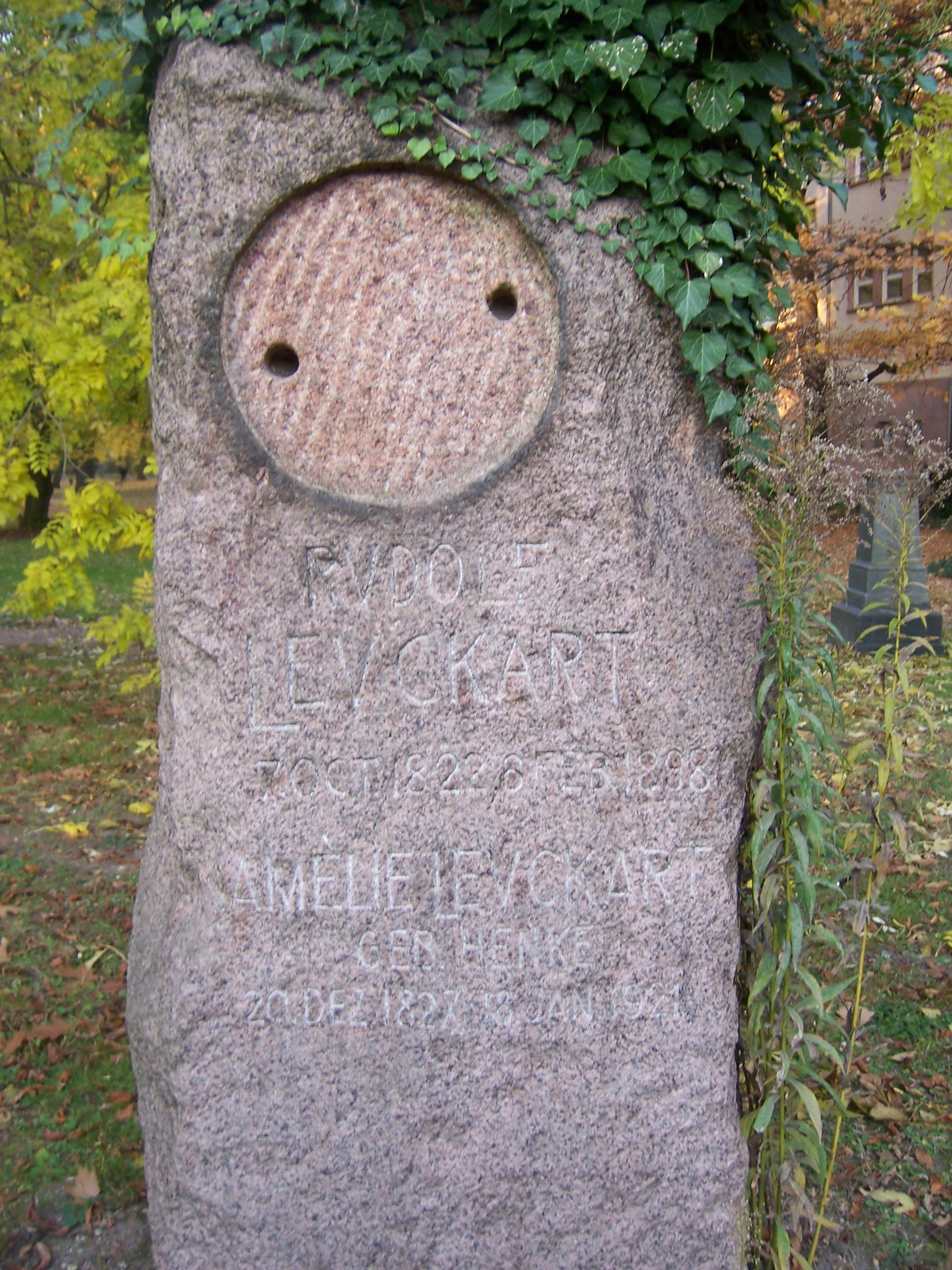
Rudolf Leuckart

== Friedenspark ==
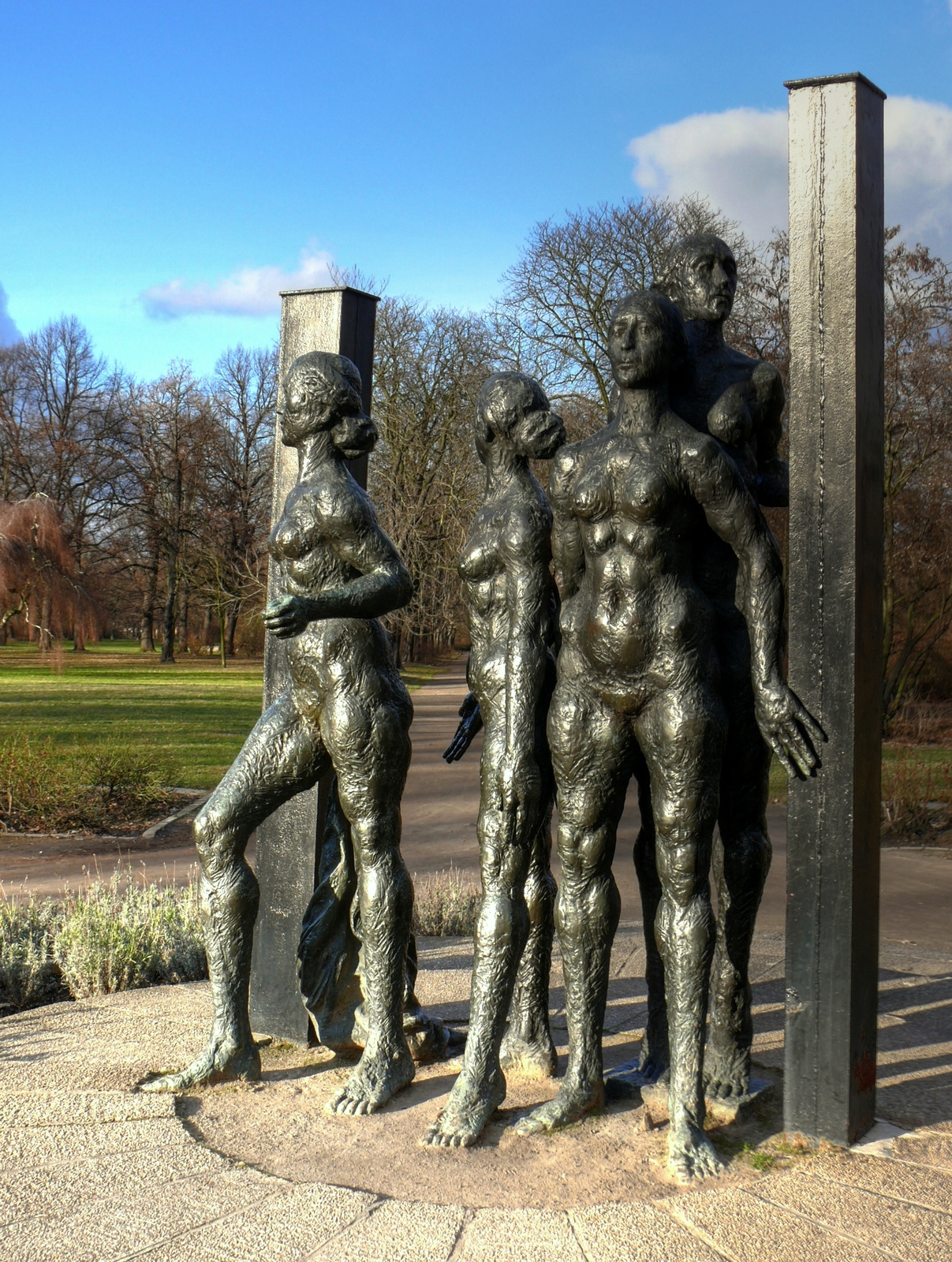
Group of figures in the Friedenspark, 2008

The general development plan of 1970 envisaged the conversion of the cemetery into a park for sport and recreation for the students of the University of Leipzig. This plan was eventually given up in favour of a public park, in order to address the need for recreation and recuperation of the inhabitants of the old housing stock in the neighbouring districts of the Ostvorstadt and Thonberg.

On 20 July 1983 the Friedenspark was declared public property.

== Literature ==
- Alfred E. Otto Paul: Der Neue Johannisfriedhof in Leipzig, Leipzig 2012, ISBN 978-3-00-039357-0
- Ein Gang auf den Neuen Friedhof zu Leipzig. In: Die Gartenlaube, year 1860, vol. 16, pp. 244, 245 Wikisource (in German)
