= Gustav Wohlgemuth =

German choral conductor and composer

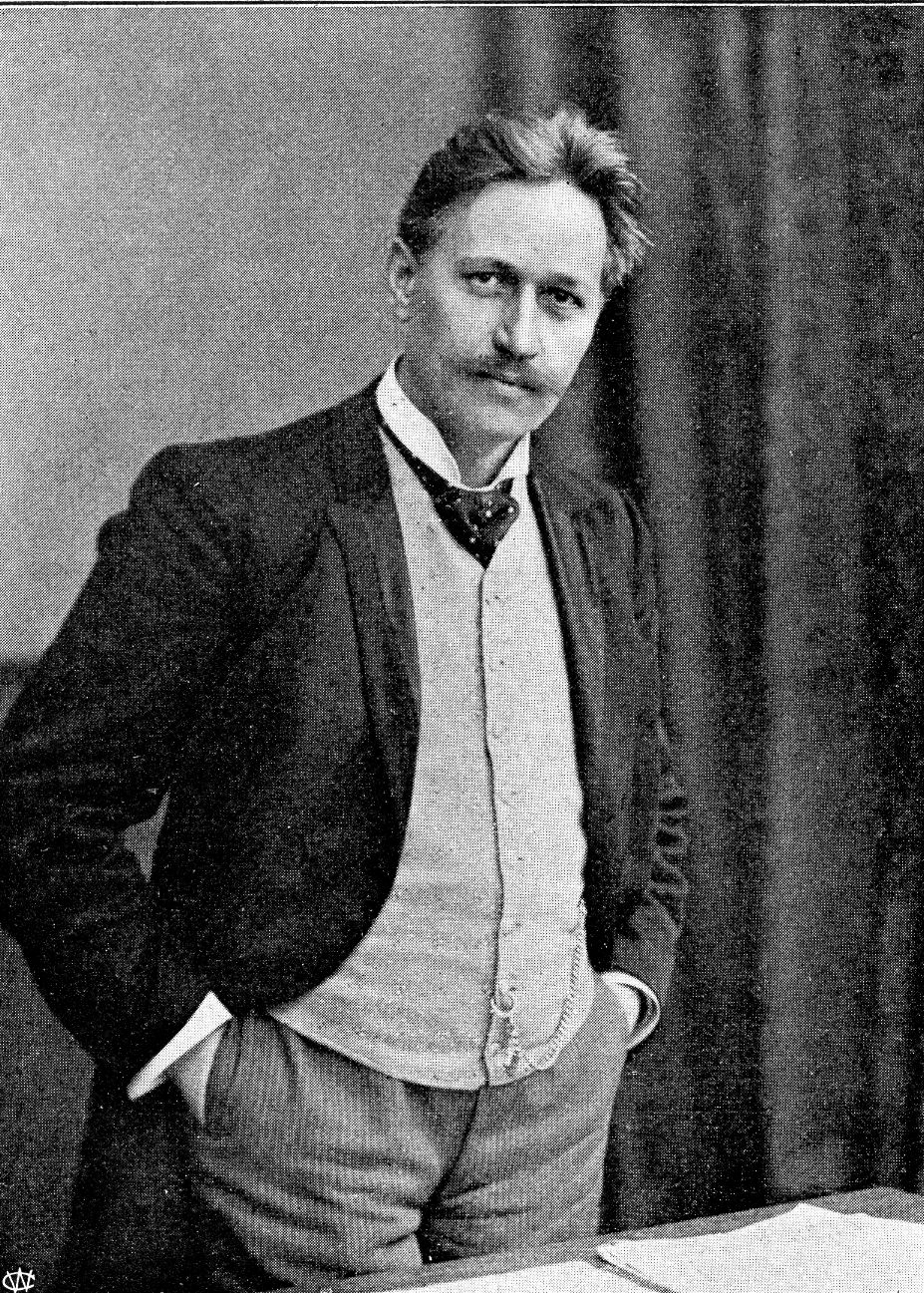
Gustav Wohlgemuth (around 1907)

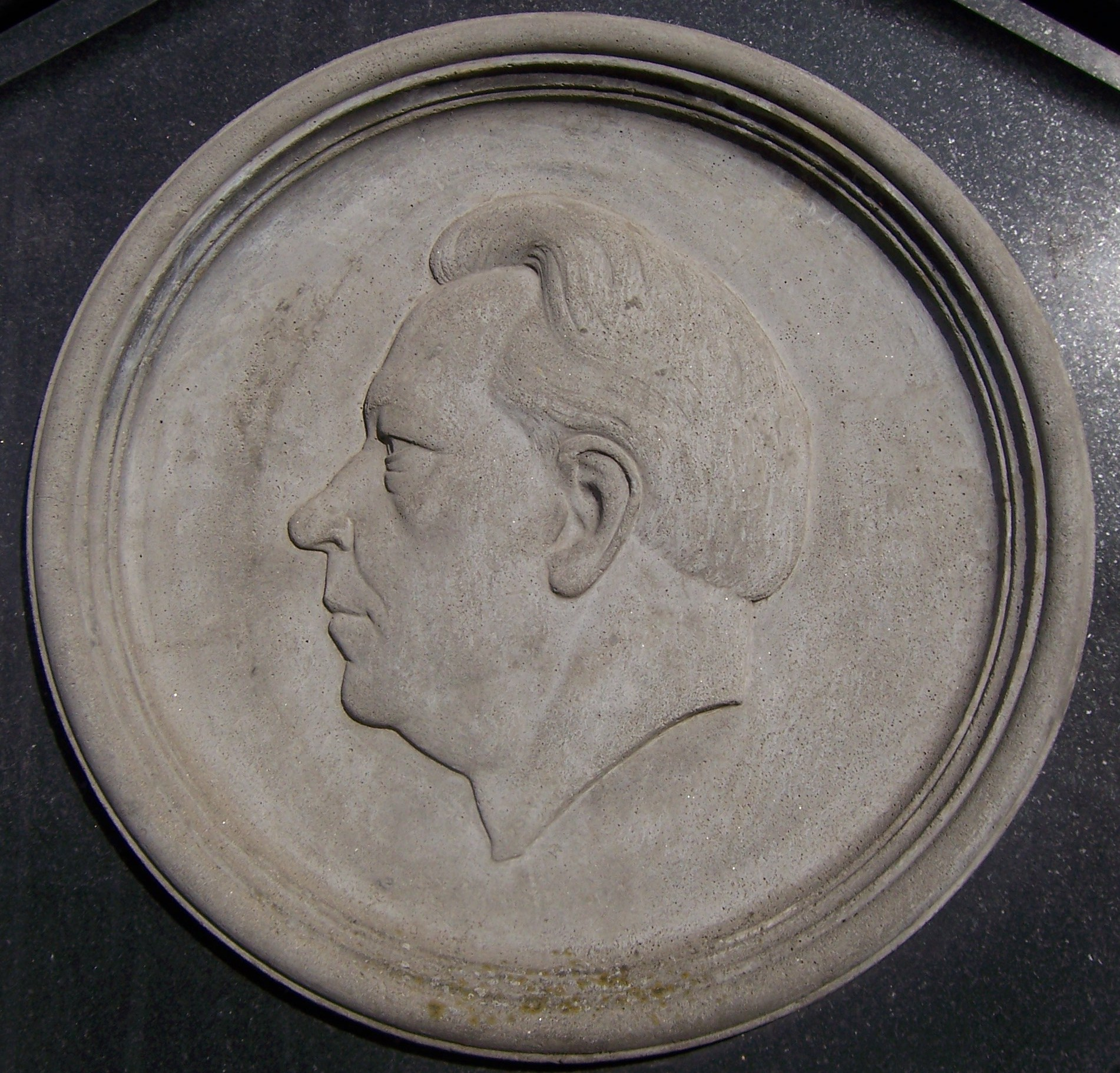
Portrait medallion of Gustav Wohlgemuth (Grabstein)

Gustav Wohlgemuth (2 December 1863 – 2 March 1937) was a German choral conductor and composer.

== Career ==
Wohlgemuth was born in Leipzig, Kingdom of Saxony. From 1878, he attended the teacher training seminar in Grimma. Afterwards he worked as a teacher in the Leipzig Volksschule . During this time he conducted two men's chorus: the Liederfels and the Liederhain. On 14 March 1891, Wohlgemuth united both choirs to form one men's chorus, which he directed until his death and led to national fame.

In 1900 he gave up his teaching profession and studied for three years at the Leipzig Conservatory. In the same year, he also took over the direction of the Leipziger Singakademie, a mixed choir which was founded in 1802 by the then director of the Gewandhaus concerts and later Thomaskantor, Johann Gottfried Schicht.

From 1896 to 1932, Wohlgemuth took part in the festivals of the Deutscher Sängerbund as festival conductor of the complete chorus. From 1898 until 1932, he was a member of the executive committee of the Deutscher Sängerbund as musical expert of the managing committee. In the autumn of 1906, Wohlgemuth took over as editor of the magazine Sängerhalle (later Deutsche Sängerbund-Zeitung) for 20 years. He was a member of the Leipzig Association of Artists and Scholars Die Leoniden.

In 1909, Wohlgemuth travelled to the US to serve as a member of the festival committee and as a judge at an international choir competition in New York.

Wohgemuth died in Leipzig aged 73 and was buried next to his wife Helene, née Neumeister (1867-1892), at the Neuer Johannisfriedhof in Leipzig. His gravestone is today in the lapidarium of the Alter Johannisfriedhof.

== Work ==
Wohlgemuth is distinguished as composer and arranger of more than 100 works especially for male chorus, among the well-known ones are Wie's daheim war, Schön ist die Jugend and Der Tauber (Horch, wie der Tauber ruft). In 1915, he wrote the piece Bismarck, Bismarck, steig auf aus dem Grab! for Bismarck's 100th birthday.

== Honours ==
After he had already received the music director title from the city of Leipzig, Wohlgemuth was appointed "Königlich Sächsischen Professor" in 1918. In 1910, Wohlgemuth received the Silver "Cross of Merit for Art and Science" and in 1924 the Marschnermedaille of the city of Hannover for his outstanding activity as conductor. In addition, Wohlgemuth was an honorary member of numerous choral societies in Germany and abroad.

Richard Strauss composed his Bardengesang op. 55 for 3 male chorus and orchestra for Wohlgemuth with the following dedication: "dedicated to Mr. Gustav Wohlgemuth, the champion of all artistic endeavours of the male choral societies, who works energetically for the goals of the Association of German Composers."

== Literature ==
- Franciscus Nagler, Hugo Löbmann, Paul Dehne: Gustav Wohlgemuth, sein Leben und Wirken. (Deutsche Männerchor-Komponisten und -Dirigenten 1). Bohn & Sohn, Leipzig [1934].
- Gustav Wohlgemuth und das 7. Deutsche Sängerbundfest in Breslau. In Der Leipziger. Illustrierte Wochenschrift. 2(1907), Nr. 32, pp. 879–880.
- Gustav Wohlgemuth, in Leipziger Beobachter. Wochenschrift für Verkehr, Wirtschaft und Kultur. 13(1937), Nr. 50, p. 652.
- Horst Riedel: Stadtlexikon Leipzig von A bis Z. Pro Leipzig, Leipzig 2005, ISBN 3-936508-03-8, Stichwort Wohlgemuth, Gustav.
- Wohlgemuth, Gustav. In Deutsche Biographische Enzyklopädie (DBE). Volume 10: Thibaut-Zycha. Saur, Munich 1999, p. 561.
