= Eduard Friedrich Ferdinand Beer =

Eduard Friedrich Ferdinand Beer (June 15, 1805 in Bautzen – April 5, 1841 in Leipzig) was a German orientalist, epigraphist and paleographer.

He was the decipherer of the Nabataean script, known at the time as the Sinaitic script. He died destitute at just 35 years old, possibly of starvation-related conditions.

== Life ==
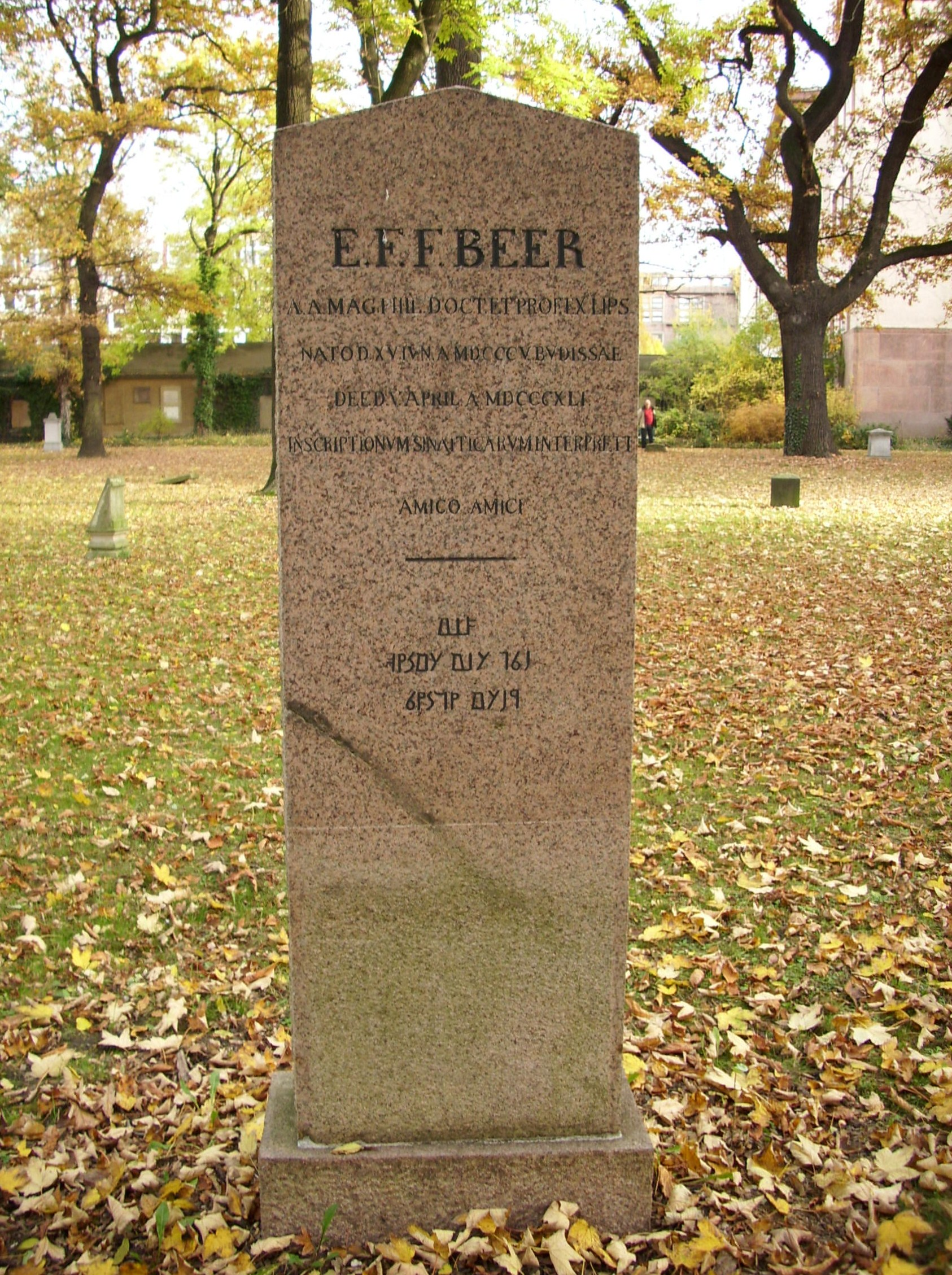
Beer's gravestone in Alter Johannisfriedhof, Leipzig, with the Latin inscription "The translator of the Sinaitic inscriptions". The memorial was arranged by his friend Heinrich Leberecht Fleischer. It includes a Nabataean (Sinaitic) inscription: 𐢝𐢑𐢒 𐢕𐢁𐢛 𐢗𐢑𐢒 𐢗𐢒𐢍𐢚𐢊 𐢈𐢕𐢗𐢒 𐢙𐢅𐢍𐢚𐢁

Eduard Friedrich Ferdinand Beer was born on June 15, 1805, in Bautzen, the son of the tailor Leonhard Beer (1775–1827) and his wife Erdmuthe Eleonora Dorothea, who was born in 1785, and the daughter of the tailor Gottlieb Apelt (1753–1805) and his wife Rosina Dorothea Friese (1761–1810).

Beer had been interested in languages since childhood. From 1817 he attended a high school in his hometown. Two years later he began to learn the Hebrew language, but also dealt with the Semitic languages in general.

Because his father died in 1827, Beer had problems financing his studies, so he worked as a proofreader on the side, despite a serious illness in 1828.

Beer knew Hebrew, English, French, Italian and Sanskrit. In addition to his university work, he studied gardening and chess. Even during his time as a professor, he received no salary apart from a few bonuses, so that he was impoverished throughout his life.

On April 5, 1841, he died in Leipzig at the age of 35 from a hemorrhage, which was the result of a lung disease that Beer had been suffering from since his youth.

== Career ==
From Easter 1824 he began studying oriental studies at the University of Leipzig. His teachers were Ernst Friedrich Karl Rosenmüller, Gustav Seyffarth and Heinrich Leberecht Fleischer. He also became friends with the orientalist Bernhard Dorn, who was a student at the same time. Beer was a member of the Hebrew Society of Georg Benedikt Winer at the university.

In 1833 Beer completed his studies. Thanks to a scholarship, he was also able to receive his doctorate in philology from the university that year, habilitating in oriental philology. His thesis Inscriptiones et papyri veteres semitici, quotquot in Aegypto reperti sunt, editi et inediti, recensiti et ad originem hebraeo-judaicam relati, cum Palaeographia hebraea concinnata could not be continued, for Wilhelm Gesenius was shortly to publish his Scripturae Linguaeque Phoeniciae, a larger work containing most of the material from Beer's work. That same year, the philosophical faculty hired him as a private lecturer.

During this time, Beer wrote for literary magazines, rather irregularly, since he had to prepare his lectures. In 1838, after a review of cuneiform inscriptions by other researchers in the Allgemeine Literatur-Zeitung, he was finally promoted to associate professor of Semitic paleography. He held this office until his death.

He was the first to deal with the inscriptions of the Nabataeans and founded this branch of Semitic epigraphy in 1840. In his main work, he interpreted inscriptions from the Sinai Peninsula for the first time.

== Works ==
- Beer, E.F.F. (1833). Inscriptiones et papyri veteres Semitici quotquot in Aegypto reperti sunt editi et inediti recensiti et ad originem Hebraeo-Judaicam relatu cum palaeographia Hebraea concinnata: particula prima (in Latin). Friderici Nies.
- Beer, E.F.F. (1838). Ueber die neuesten Forschungen zur Entzifferung der Keilschrift (in German).
- Beer, E.F.F. (1840). Studia Asiatica Fasciculus III: Inscriptiones Veteres Litteris Et Lingua Hucusque Incognitis Ad Montem Sinai Magno Numero Servatae Quas Pocock, Niebur, Montagu, Coutelle, Seetzen, Burckhardt, De Laborde, Grey Aliique Descripserunt (in Latin). Sumptibus Joannis Ambrosii Barth.

== Gallery ==
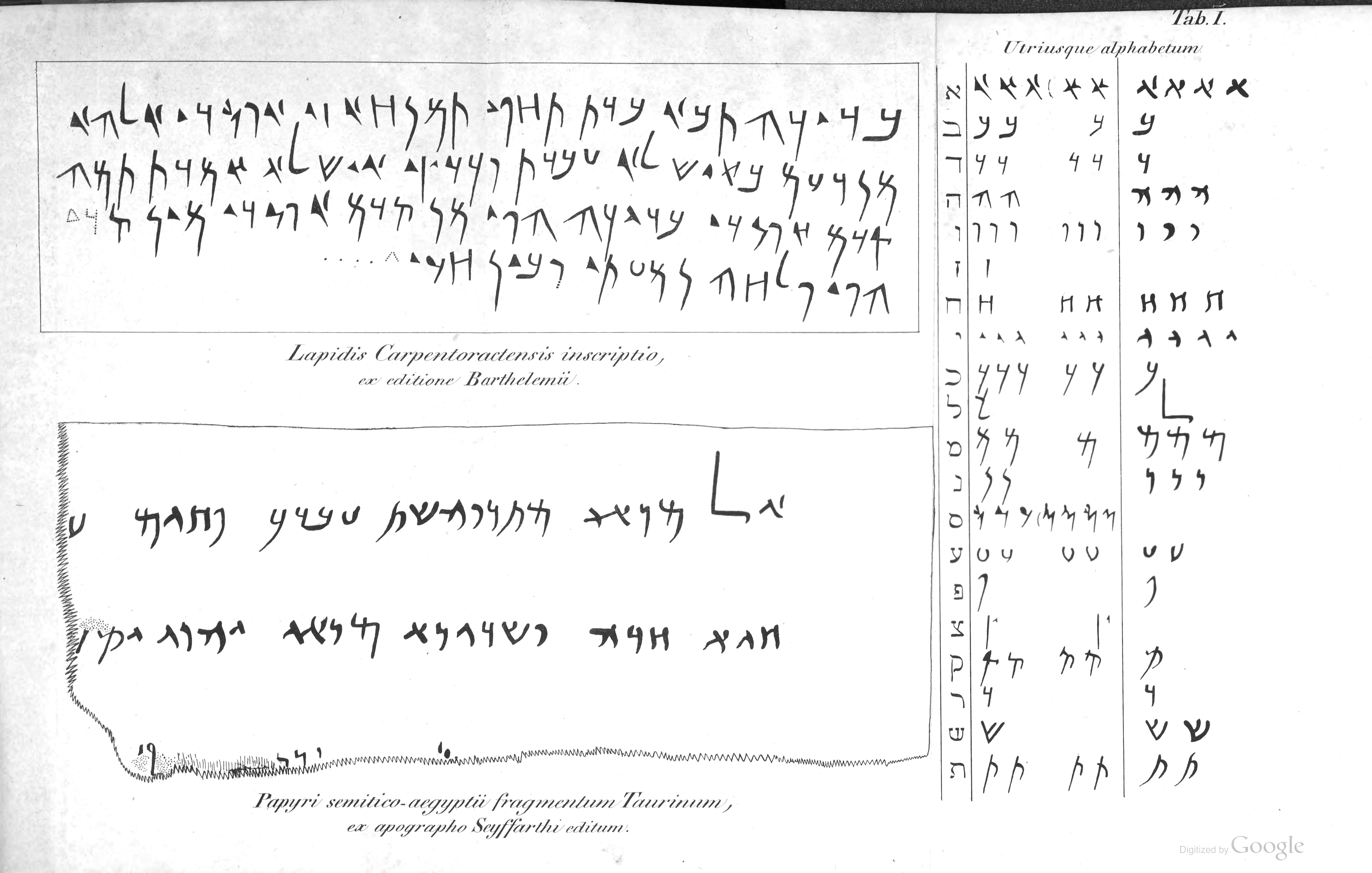
Beer's comparison of the Turin Aramaic Papyrus with the Carpentras Stele, 1833

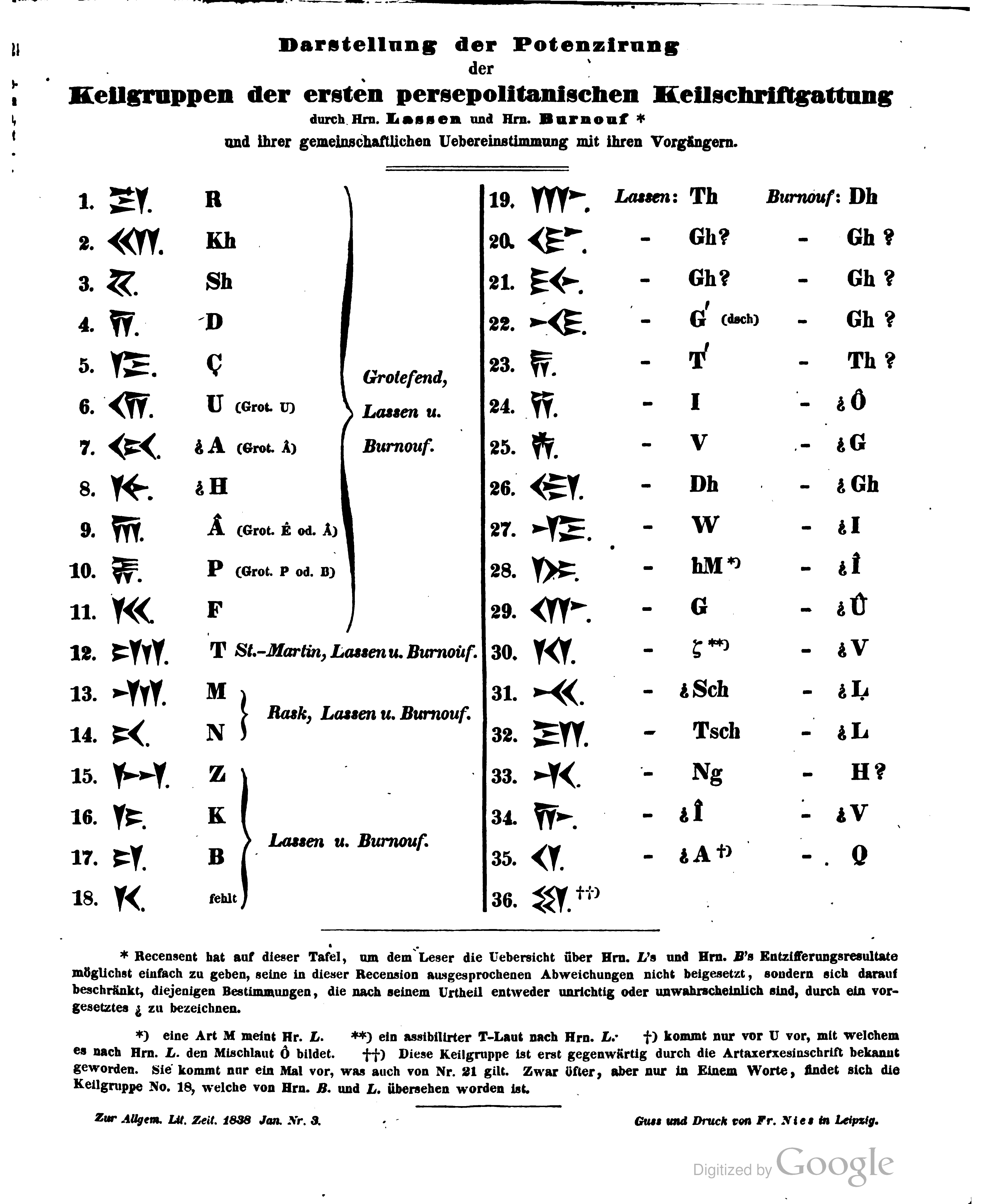
Beer's cuneiform comparison, 1838

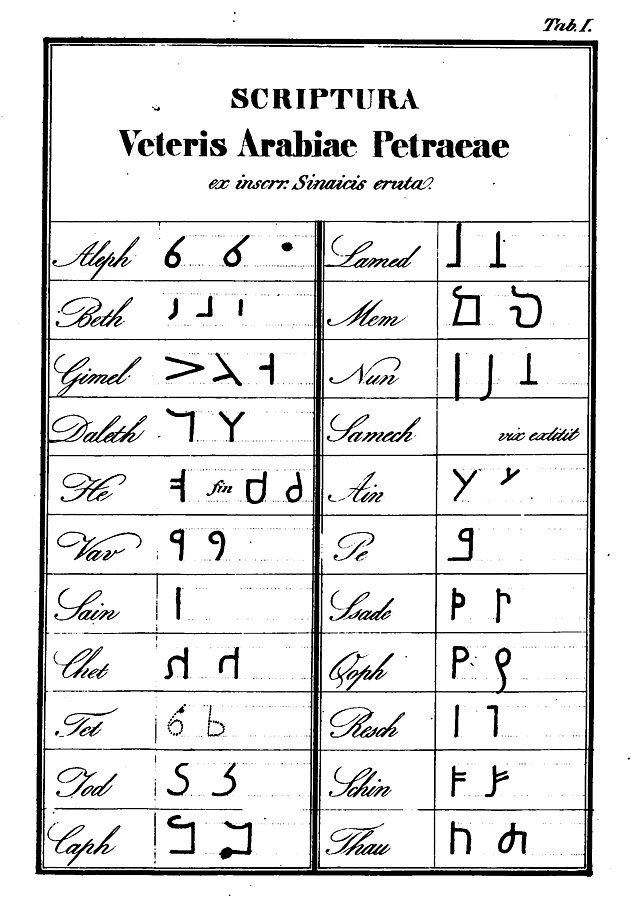
Beer's decipherment of the Sinaitic (Nabataean) script, 1840

== Literature ==
- Carl Gustav Adolf Siegfried (1875). "Beer, Eduard Friedrich Ferdinand". Allgemeine Deutsche Biographie (in German). Vol. 2. Leipzig: Duncker & Humblot. pp. 247–248.
- Friedrich Stummer (1953). "Beer, Eduard Friedrich Ferdinand". Neue Deutsche Biographie (in German). Vol. 1. Berlin: Duncker & Humblot. pp. 735–735. (full text online).
