= Franz von Holstein =

German composer (1826–1878)

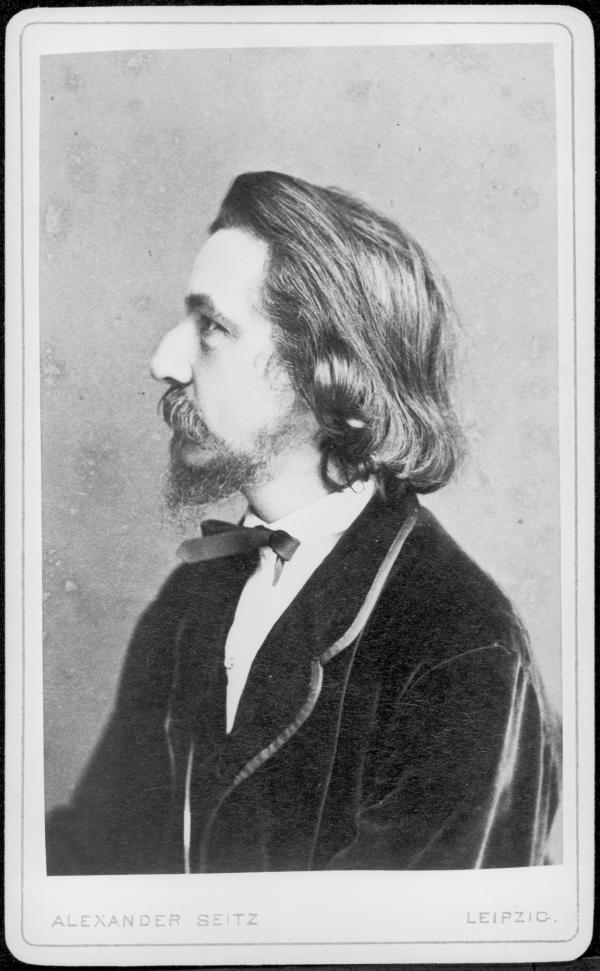
Franz von Holstein (1874)

Franz von Holstein (16 February 1826 – 22 May 1878) was a German composer.

== Life ==
Born in Braunschweig, Holstein was the son of the Duchy of Brunswick colonel and Council of wars Werner von Holstein (1784–1857).

Coming from the Cadet Corps, Holstein joined the Infantry Regiment as Second Leutnant on 6 October 1845 and took part in the First Schleswig War against Denmark in 1848/49. As Oberleutnant, his assignment as adjutant of the 2nd Landwehr Battalion followed from 18 March 1850, until Holstein finally took his leave on 11 March 1853.

Already during his officer training, he composed the opera Zwei Nächte in Venedig as well as Lieder and ballads. In 1853, he came to Leipzig, where he studied counterpoint with Moritz Hauptmann and had piano lessons with Ignaz Moscheles. After stays in Rome, Berlin and Paris, he took over the direction of the Bach Society in Leipzig. In addition to three operas, he wrote two overtures, a cantata, chamber music works and piano pieces and had an outstanding reputation as a Lieder composer.

Holstein died in Leipzig at the age of 52 and was buried in the Friedenspark (now Lapidarium Alter Johannisfriedhof). In this city, his wife Hedwig, daughter of the city councillor Rudolf Julius Salomon, established the so-called Holstein-Stift, a foundation to support impecunious music students.

== Work ==
- Operas:
  - Der Haideschacht. (1868)
  - Der Erbe von Morley. (1872)
  - Die Hochländer. (1876)
- Lieder for one voice, duets, mixed and men's chorus.
- Chamber music
- Ouvertüres
