= Alter Johannisfriedhof =

Coordinates: 51°20′13″N 12°23′22″E

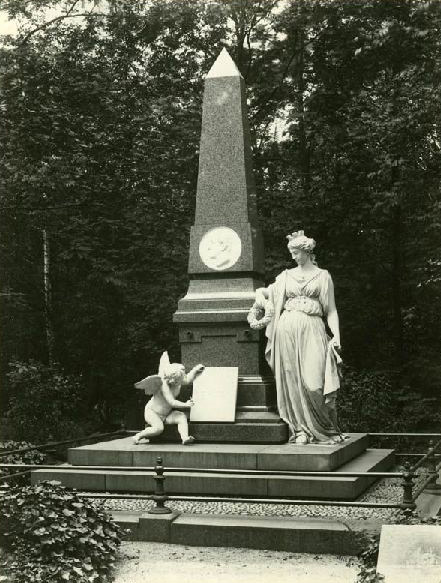
Grassi monument

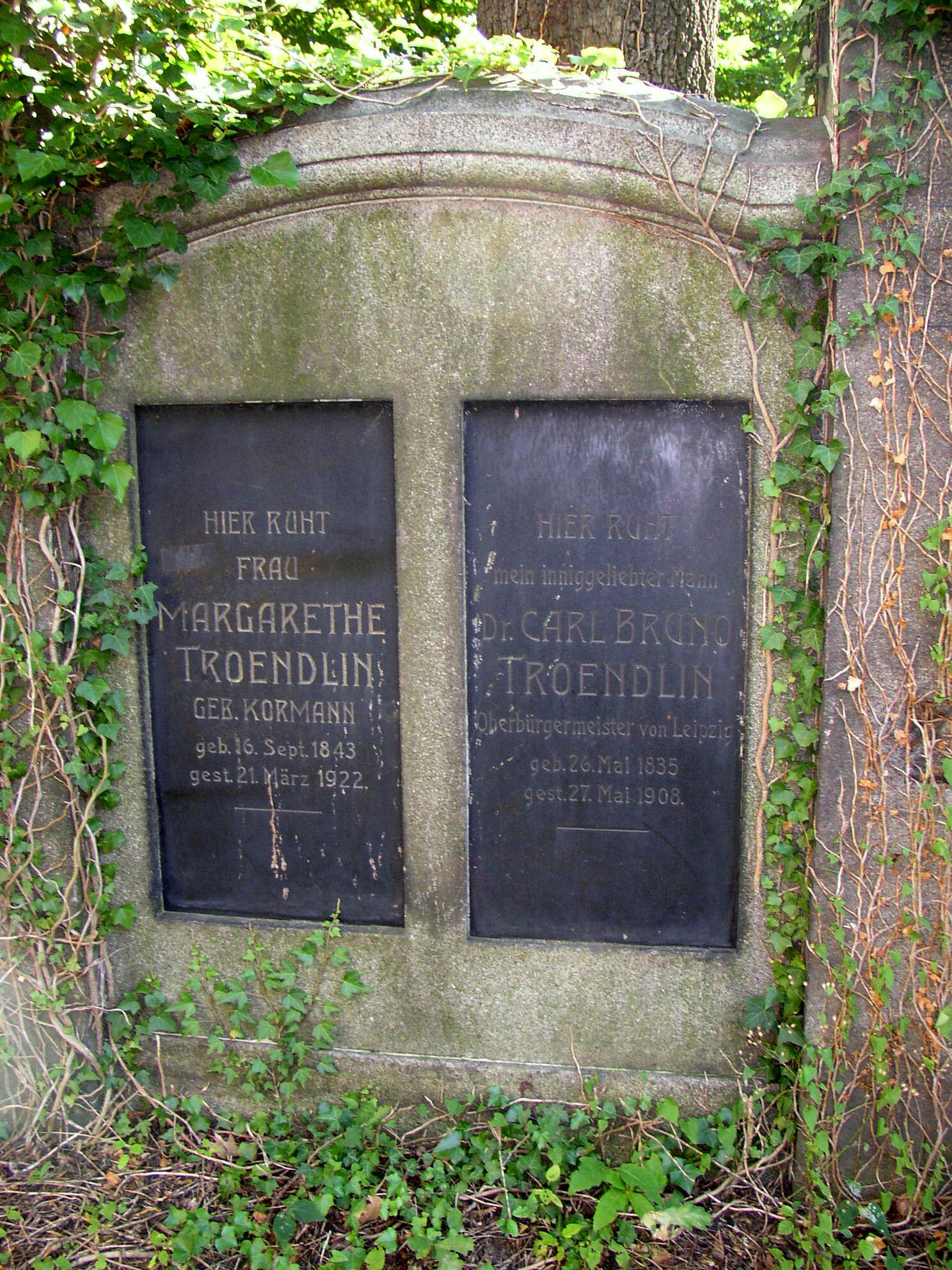
Gravestone of Carl Bruno Tröndlin, transferred from the Neuer Johannisfriedhof

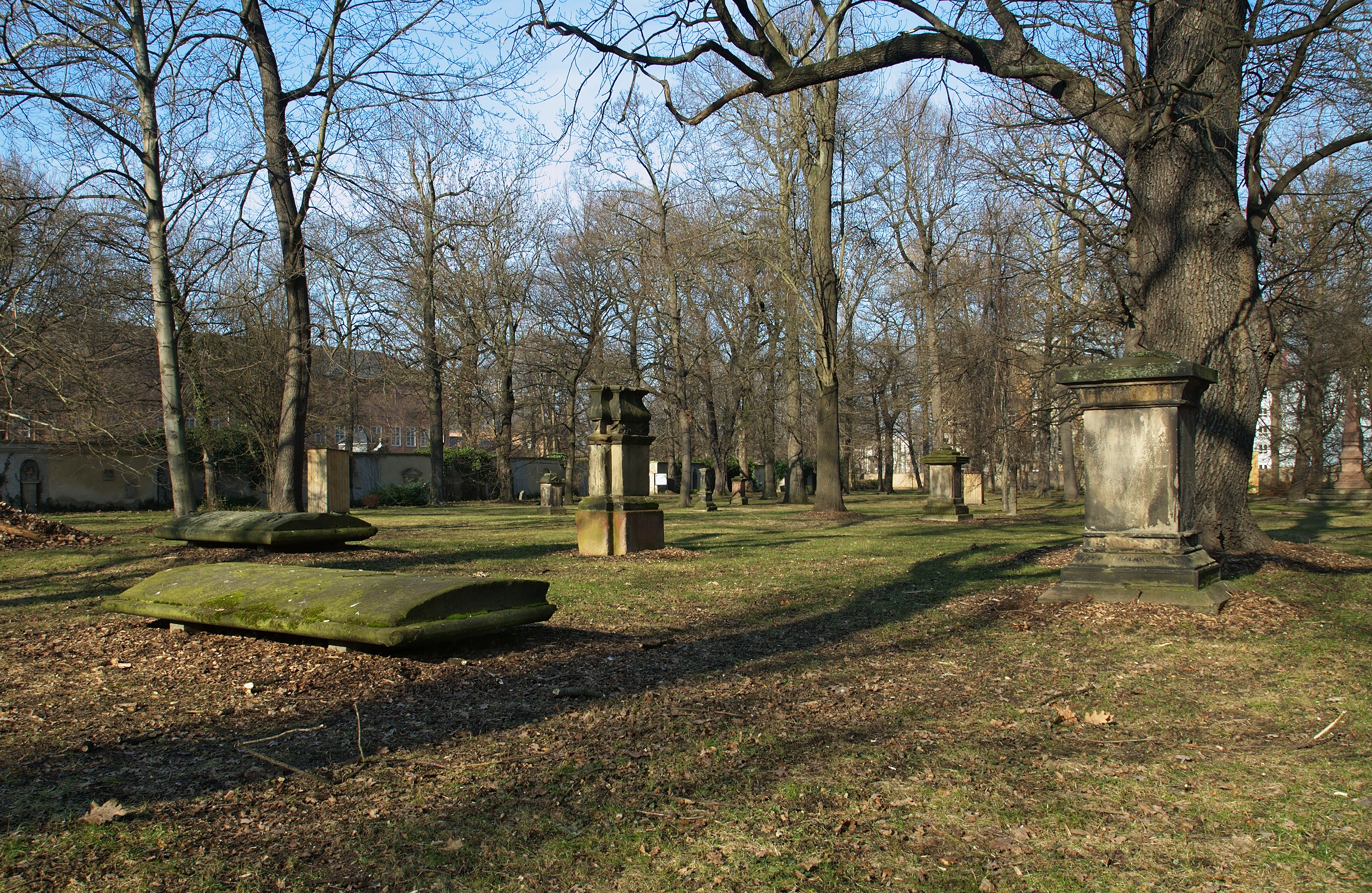
View of the site in 2011

The Alter Johannisfriedhof ("Old St. John's Cemetery") is the oldest burial ground in the city of Leipzig, Germany. It began in 1278, as part of the Johannishospital (St. John's Hospital) in Leipzig, a leper hospital. It was later attached to the Johanniskirche (St. John's Church), which was destroyed in World War II. In 1536 it became the common burial ground for the city of Leipzig, and expanded several times. It was also re-modeled in the style of the Camposanto in Pisa, a popular style of cemetery in Germany. In 1680 and 1805 the graveyard was expanded by the additions of sections three and four respectively, then the fifth and the final extension took place between 1827 and 1863. 1883 saw its last burial.

In 1981 the graveyard was closed and comprehensively cleared. Fifty-eight monuments and gravestones from the former Neuer Johannisfriedhof, which had similarly been cleared and re-developed as the present Friedenspark, were set up in the south-eastern corner of the Alter Johannisfriedhof. Since 1995 the former burial ground has again been accessible to the public, and is a protected monument as a museum and park.

== History ==
The burial ground was in existence as early as 1278 on the land of the Johannishospital (St. John's Hospital) in Leipzig, a leper hospital. It was later attached to the Johanniskirche (St. John's Church), built in the 14th century and destroyed in World War II. At first the burials were mostly of those who died of leprosy. In 1476 the burial ground was enlarged, after the order of the Prince-Elector that inhabitants of Leipzig without citizenship should also be buried there. In 1536 George, Duke of Saxony, ordered that it should become the common burial ground for the city of Leipzig. Consequently, the first and second sections were both expanded several times. At the same time it was re-modelled in the style of the Camposanto in Pisa, a popular style of cemetery in Germany.

In 1680 and 1805 the graveyard was expanded by the additions of sections three and four respectively. When this additional space was also full, the final extension, in the form of the fifth section, took place between 1827 and 1863. By 1846, however, it was clear that further extension was impossible, and a new cemetery, the Neuer Johannisfriedhof, was opened on a different site.

During its history the burial ground was involved in military events on several occasions. During the Thirty Years' War Swedish troops camped here and partly destroyed it. In September 1813 it was used as a camp for prisoners and the wounded when the military hospitals in the city were full up. Soldiers lived in the vaults and used the coffins for firewood.

In the fourth section are unmarked mass graves for victims of the Seven Years' War and of the Battle of Leipzig.

In 1883 the first and second sections were re-planned and converted to a park layout, during which process the only tomb to remain untouched was that of Christian Fürchtegott Gellert. On Christmas Eve of the same year the burial of a Dr. Emil Breiter brought to an end the graveyard's more than 600 years of use for burials. Between 1484 and 1834 257,275 burials are recorded. The burials were mostly of Germans, but Swiss and French people, Russians, Italians, English people and Americans were also buried here.

When the nave of the Johanniskirche of 1585 was replaced by a larger building in October 1894, the bones of Johann Sebastian Bach were discovered, which had been buried in the graveyard on 31 July 1750. The bones of Bach and of Gellert were placed in 1900 in a vault beneath the altar of the church.

Between 1925 and 1929 on a site covering most of the former first section, all of the second section and the site of the former hospital, the new Grassi Museum was built.

As the 20th century progressed the burial ground lost its fifth section as a result of the widening of the neighbouring streets and the construction of the Gutenberg School. Many monuments and gravestones were thus displaced. Of the many vault buildings still extant in the 1920s only that of the Baumgärtner family has been kept. On 4 December 1943 the Johanniskirche was destroyed during an air raid. It was only possible to save and reinforce the tower, but it was blown up in 1963.

In 1981 the graveyard was closed and over the next fourteen years comprehensively cleared. In 1991 58 monuments and gravestones from the former Neuer Johannisfriedhof, which had similarly been cleared and re-developed as the present Friedenspark, were set up in the south-eastern corner of the Alter Johannisfriedhof. Since 1995 the former burial ground has again been accessible to the public, and is a protected monument as a museum and park.

== Selected burials ==
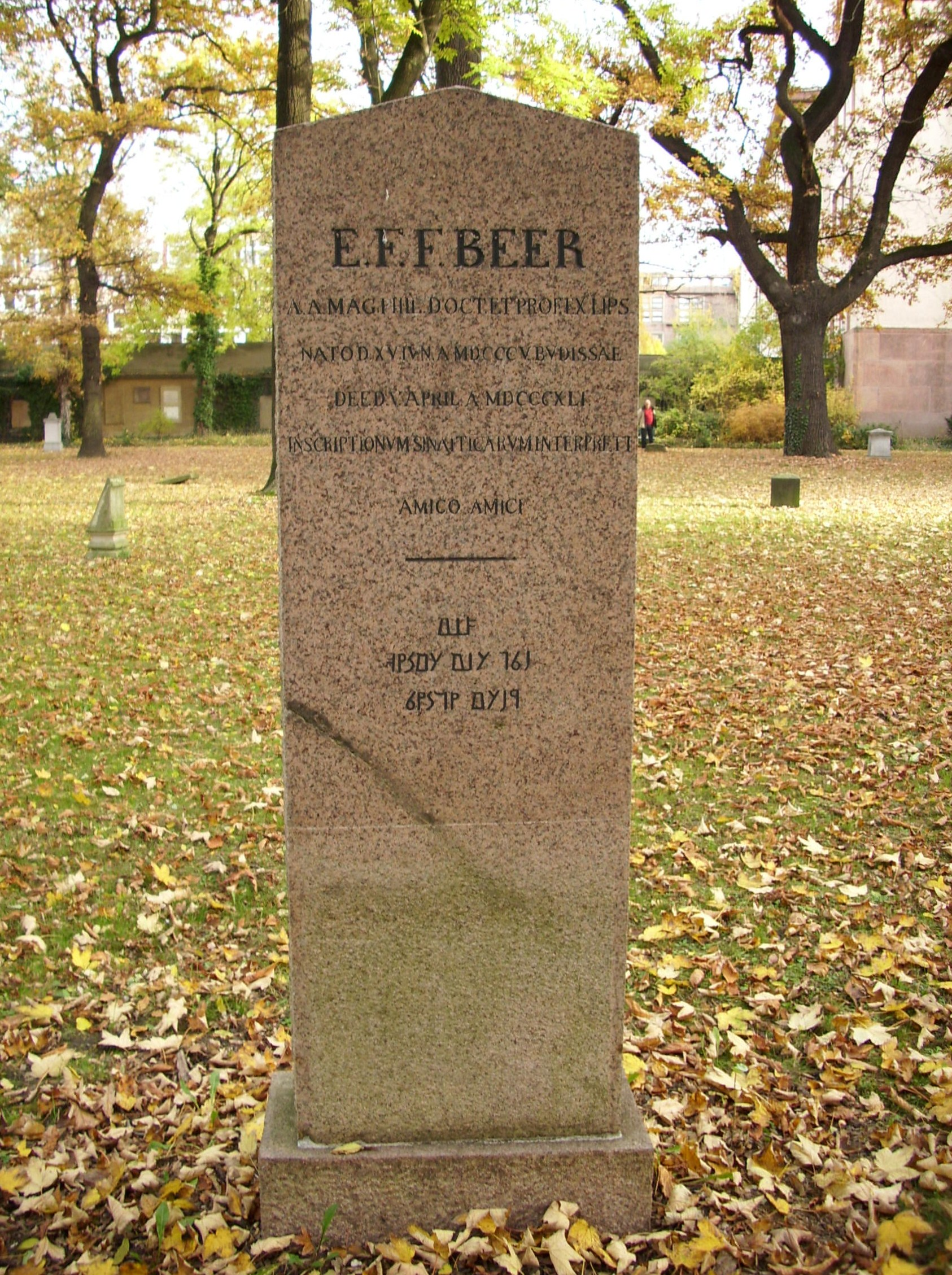
Eduard Friedrich Ferdinand Beer's gravestone, with the Latin inscription "The translator of the Sinaitic inscriptions". The memorial was arranged by his friend Heinrich Leberecht Fleischer. It includes a Nabataean (Sinaitic) inscription: 𐢝𐢑𐢒 𐢕𐢁𐢛 𐢗𐢑𐢒 𐢗𐢒𐢍𐢚𐢊 𐢈𐢕𐢗𐢒 𐢙𐢅𐢍𐢚𐢁

- Eduard Friedrich Ferdinand Beer (1805–1841), orientalist
- Roderich Benedix (1811–1873), playwright and author (V)
- Heinrich Wilhelm Brandes (1777–1834), physicist and astronomer (NE)
- Friedrich Arnold Brockhaus (1772–1823), publisher
- Franz Dominic Grassi (1801–1880), Leipzig businessman and patron of the arts
- Gustav Harkort (1795–1865), railway pioneer (V)
- Ernst Innozenz Hauschild (1808–1866), teacher
- Karl Herloßsohn (1804–1849), author, journalist und encyclopaedist (NE)
- Johann Adam Hiller (1728–1804), composer (NE)
- Johann Conrad Hinrichs (1763–1813), publisher
- David Hoyer (1667–1720), painter (NE)
- Anna Katharina Kanne (1746–1810) ("Käthchen Schönkopf")
- Gottlieb Christian Kreutzberg (1810/14–1874), menagerie proprietor
- Wilhelm Traugott Krug (1770–1842), philosopher (V)
- Samuel Morus (1736–1792), philologist and evangelical theologian (NE)
- Ignaz Moscheles (1794-1870), composer and pianist (NE)
- Adam Friedrich Oeser (1717–1799), painter (NE)
- Timotheus Ritzsch (1614–1678), book printer, inventor of the daily newspaper (NE)
- Johann Friedrich Rochlitz (1769–1842), dramatist
- Johann Georg Rosenmüller (1736–1815), superintendent of St. Thomas's Church (V)
- Johann Schelle (1648–1701), cantor of St. Thomas's Church (NE)
- Veit Hanns Schnorr von Carolsfeld (1764–1841), painter (NE)
- Ludwig Schuncke (1810–1834), composer and co-founder of the Neue Zeitschrift für Musik
- Johann Michael Stock (1737–1773), copper engraver (NE)
- Christian Theodor Weinlig (1780–1842), composer
- Christian Felix Weiße (1726–1804), poet
- Johann Heinrich Zedler (1706–1751), (NE)
- Wilhelmine von Zenge, married name Krug (1780–1852), betrothed of Heinrich von Kleist (V)
- Georg Joachim Zollikofer (1730–1788), preacher (NE)

NE = grave lost; V = gravestone extant, but no longer marking the grave

== Literature ==
- Paul Benndorf, 1922: Der Alte Johannisfriedhof in Leipzig. Ein Beitrag zur Stadtgeschichte. H. Haessel Verlag, Leipzig (the most comprehensive account with many photographs of the lost graves, with a plan of the burial ground)
- Frank Reichert, 2006: Das Ende der Kirchenbegräbnisse und der Bau der Hospitalgruft zu St. Johannis in: Stadtgeschichte. Mitteilungen des Leipziger Geschichtsvereins e. V. (pp. 55–66) ISSN 1437-8604
- Erich Schmidt: Der alte Johannisfriedhof in Leipzig in: Mitteilungen des Landesvereins Sächsischer Heimatschutz 4(1914)5 (pp. 145–154), Dresden 1914 (Online version)
- Leipzig City Council (Parks and Amenities Department) (ed.): Der Alte Johannisfriedhof (leaflet), Leipzig 1995
