= Rudolf Dietsch =

German philologist (1814–1875)

Heinrich Rudolf Dietsch (16 March 1814, in Mylau – 29 December 1875, in Stötteritz) was a German philologist.

== Biography ==
From 1832 to 1836 he studied classical philology and history at the University of Leipzig as a pupil of Gottfried Hermann, Wilhelm Wachsmuth and Anton Westermann, then continued his education at Halle as a student of Gottfried Bernhardy and Heinrich Leo. He taught classes at the gymnasium in Hildburghausen and at the state school in Grimma, and in 1861 was appointed an academic rector in Plauen. In 1866 he returned to Grimma, where he served as rector up until 1872.

From 1847 to 1862 he was one of the editors of the journal Neue Jahrbücher für Philologie und Pädagogik. He published a valuable edition of the complete works of Sallust (2 volumes, 1843–46; 4th edition 1874), and a Versuch über Thucydides ("Essay on Thucydides", 1865).
