= Carl Otto Müller =

German painter (1901–1970)

- Born: 28 October 1901; Coburg, Germany
- Died: 28 December 1970 (aged 69); Munich, Germany
- Occupation: Painter

Carl Otto Müller (28 October 1901 – 28 December 1970) was a German painter. His work was part of the painting event in the art competition at the 1936 Summer Olympics.
