= Gustav Harkort =

German railway entrepreneur

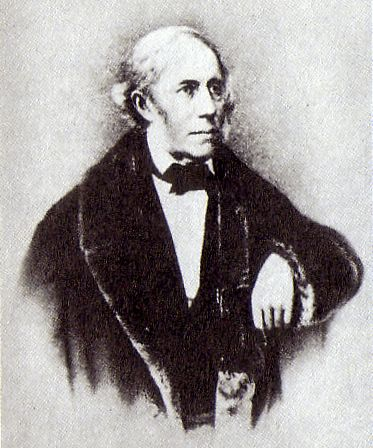
Gustav Harkort, 1850

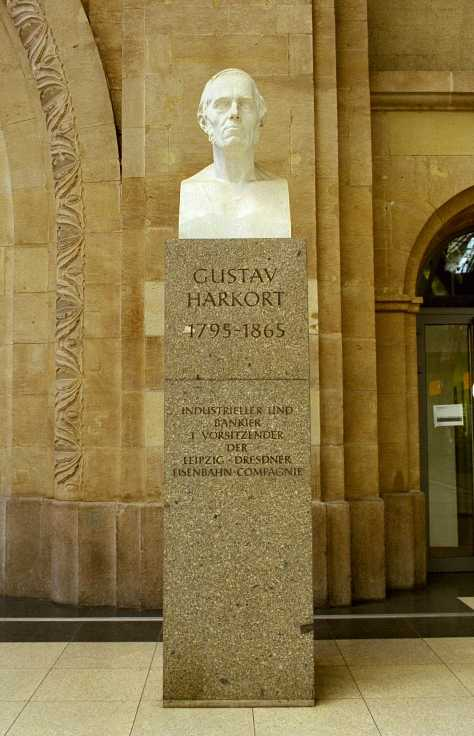
Gustav Harkort-Denkmal in Leipzig

Gustav Harkort (3 March 1795, in Hagen – 29 August 1865, in Leipzig) was a German entrepreneur and railroad pioneer from Leipzig, Germany.

== Biography ==
Gustav Harkort was the sixth of eight children of the hardware manufacturer and merchant Johann Caspar Harkort IV. He was also the brother of industrialist and politician Friedrich Harkort, entrepreneur Johann Caspar Harkort V. and mining engineer and officer Eduard Harkort.

Gustav Harkort attended the trade school in Hagen, and after completion, began a commercial apprenticeship in his father's company. In 1813 he took part in the German Campaign of 1813 as a lieutenant in the Märkisches Landwehr Regiment.

In 1829 Harkort directed the planning for the construction of the Magdeburg-Leipzig railway line.

On 3 April 1834 Harkort was one of the founders of the Railway Committee, which adopted the concept for a German railway network by Friedrich List (1789–1846) and built a first route between Leipzig and Dresden (The Leipzig-Dresden Railway). He was the chairman of the board of directors of the Leipzig-Dresden Railway Company from its foundation in 1835 until his death.

Harkort died on 29 August 1865 in Leipzig at the age of 70.

== Recognitions ==
In 1864, on the 25th anniversary of the completion of the Leipzig-Dresden railway, Harkort was named an honorary citizen of the city of Leipzig.

On 9 July 1878 a monument designed by the architect Carl Gustav Aeckerlein (1832–1886) in collaboration with the sculptor Eduard Lürssen (1840–1891) was inaugurated in Leipzig. Harkort's name is also included on the Leipzig railway memorial.

== Literature ==
- Robert Boker : Harkort, Gustav. In: New German Biography (NDB). Volume 7, Duncker & Humblot, Berlin 1966, ISBN 3-428-00188-5, p. 875 f.(Digitized).
- Vera Hauschild (ed.): The great Leipzig people. 26 approximations. Insel Verlag, Frankfurt am Main and others 1996, ISBN 3-458-16780-3.
