= Jodenbuurt =

Coordinates: 52°22′09″N 4°54′09″E

- Neighborhood of Amsterdam
- Interactive map of Jodenbuurt
- Country: Netherlands
- Province: North Holland
- COROP: Amsterdam
- Time zone: UTC+1 (CET)

The Jodenbuurt (Dutch: Jewish neighbourhood) is a neighbourhood of Amsterdam, Netherlands. For centuries before World War II, it was the center of the Dutch Jews of Amsterdam — hence, its name (literally Jewish quarter). It is best known as the birthplace of Baruch Spinoza, the home of Rembrandt, and the Jewish ghetto of Nazi occupation of the Netherlands.

== Boundaries ==
Traditionally, the boundaries of the Jodenbuurt, east of the city center, are the Amstel River in the southwest, the Zwanenburgwal "Swans City Wall" and Oudeschans "Old Rampart" canals in the northwest, Rapenburg, a street in the northeast and the Nieuwe Herengracht "New Patricians Canal" in the southeast. But it grew to include parts of Nieuwmarkt "New Market", Sint Antoniesbreestraat "St. Anthony's Broad Street", the Plantage "Plantation", and Weesperzijde "Weesp Side", especially after 1882, when two canals, the Leprozengracht "Lepers Canal" and the Houtgracht "Wood Canal", were filled in.

== History ==
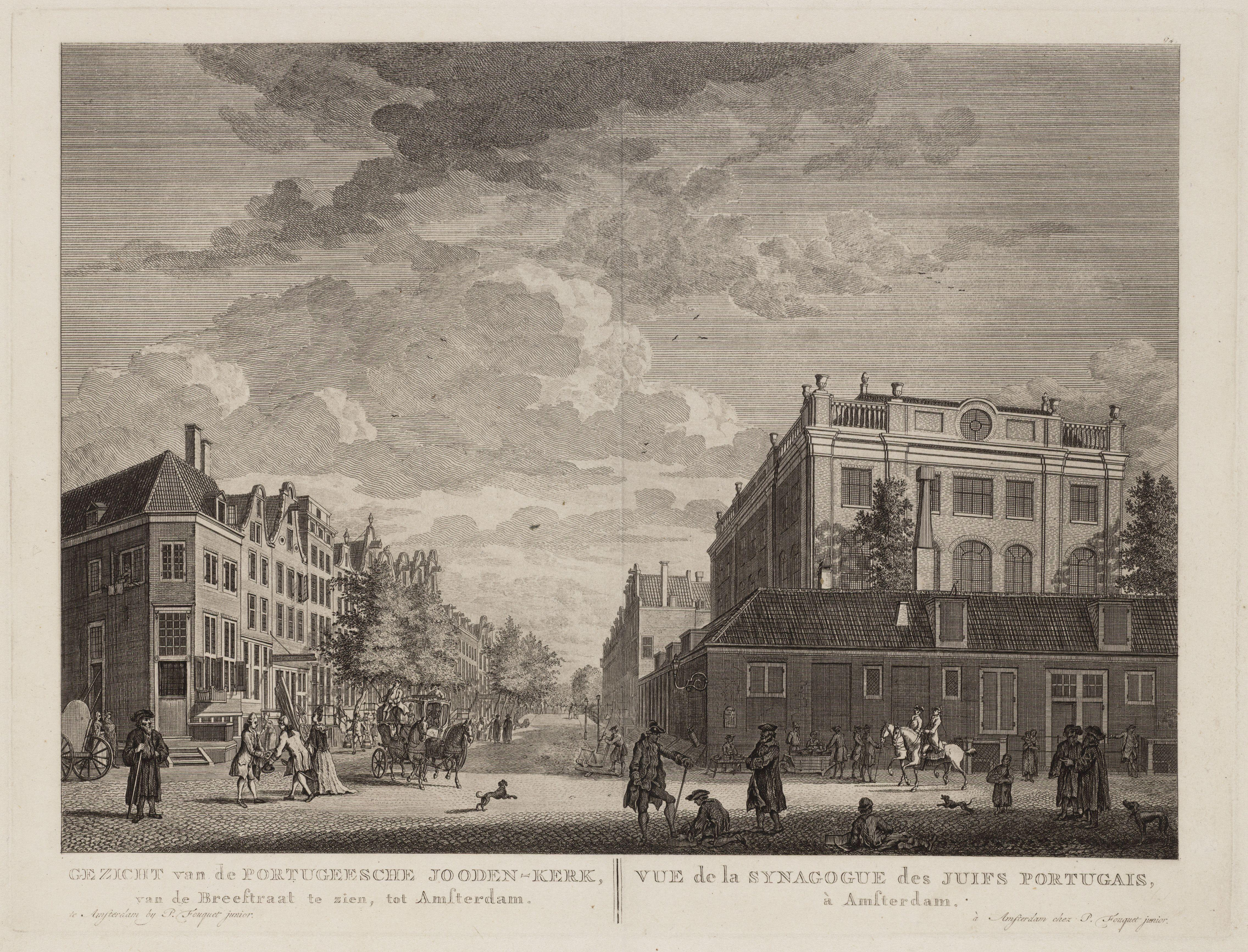
The Portuguese Synagogue in the middle of the former Jodenbuurt in an engraving from the Fouquet-Atlas ( 1760-1783 ). Photo: bma.amsterdam.nl.

The first Jews to settle in Amsterdam were the Sephardim, who had been expelled from Portugal and Spain in 1493. They were joined in the following decades by the Ashkenazi from Central and Eastern Europe, the first of whom had come from Germany in 1600. In those years, the only available land for them was at the outskirts of the eastern side of the Centrum — the island of Vlooienburg, surrounded by the Amstel River and the canals — so they settled along the island's main street, Breestraat, which quickly became known as Jodenbreestraat [ "Jewish Broad Street" ]. ( The nearby square, Waterlooplein [ "Waterloo Square" ], would not be created until 1882, when the Leprozengracht and the Houtgracht were drained. ) By 1612, the population was about 500 people but it doubled to about 1,000 in 1620 and again to 2,500 in 1672. The Jews gave their new home, Amsterdam, its Hebrew name, Mokum ( "place" ) to show that they had finally felt at home in the city.

This was because, with the Union of Utrecht in 1579, all the residents of the Dutch Republic were to be given religious freedom, the first time a European country had ever established and enshrined the freedom of religion as the law of the land. So the Jews were allowed to build their own synagogues. The first of them was the Beth Jakob, built between 1602 and 1610, followed by the second synagogue, Neve Shalom, constructed between 1608 and 1612, and the third, Beth Israel, founded in 1618. They were all Sephardic. They were all hidden and therefore not visible from the streets.

But the Jews were not alone in the Jodenbuurt. They were joined by several Christians. One of them was the artist Rembrandt, who was fascinated by the "Biblical" faces of his new neighbors. In 1641, a group of Franciscans also came to establish a Catholic clandestine church in a house called "Moses", out of the reach of the Protestant authorities of Amsterdam. Known as the "Jewish Church", it began as the Sint-Anthoniuskerk [ "St. Anthony of Padua Church" ] but it grew into the Mozes en Aäronkerk [ "Moses and Aaron Church" ]. It is still standing today at the Waterlooplein.

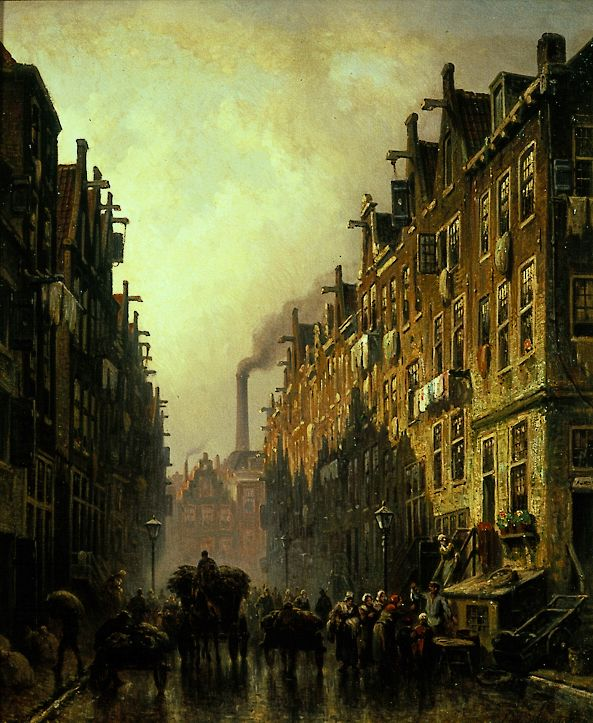
Jodenbuurt in Amsterdam, 1889, Eduard Alexander Hilverdink.

On 8 November 1616, the Jews were made legal citizens by the City of Amsterdam. But they were still not allowed to enter certain occupations; they were not permitted to join the guilds of Amsterdam. So they were limited to street trading, financing, book printing and diamond cutting — the only occupations that were open to them. From 1622, the synagogues began to cooperate for the good of the Jodenbuurt. On 3 April 1693, they merged their districts into a single municipality under the name of Talmud Torah. In that year, they also opened the first synagogue that was visible from the streets. It stood on the Houtgracht, at the present Waterlooplein. Next to the new synagogue on Nieuwe Amstelstraat [ "New Amstel Street" ] was a meat market, where the residents of the neighborhood could buy their kosher meat.

The Sephardi did not have proper knowledge about Judaism. They were not allowed to be Jews in Portugal and Spain but they were allowed to live as the so-called Marranos or fake Christians. So in Amsterdam they sent for the rabbis to come out of Italy, North Africa, and the Ottoman Empire to teach them the ways of Judaism in the Jodenbuurt. The first Ashkenazi shul, the Great Synagogue ( now the Jewish Historical Museum ), and the fifth Sephardi shul, the Portuguese-Israelite Synagogue, were opened in 1671 and 1675, respectively, immortalized by the engravings of the Dutchman, Romeyn de Hooghe ( 1645–1708 ). The Portuguese Synagogue was the place where Spinoza was placed under the ban by the Sephardic Jewish community in 1656.

Because of their knowledge of Spanish and Portuguese, many of the Sephardim were involved with trade and plantations in the Spanish and Portuguese colonies in South America. Several Jews, such as Isaac de Pinto and his father David, had a great influence on the national government of the Republic of the Seven United Provinces but they came under heavy criticism from the Doelisten, a political coalition of Orangists, moderates, radicals and democrats. In the days of the Batavian Republic, several residents of the Jodenbuurt, including Jonas Daniel Meijer ( 1780–1834 ), the first Jewish lawyer in the Netherlands, and Carel Asser ( 1780–1836 ), a judge, were admitted to the bar, the civil societies and even municipal politics but they came in conflict with the parnassiem, the religious leaders of their neighborhood.

=== 19th and early 20th centuries ===
The achievements of Isaac da Costa, Abraham Capadose and other Jews were made possible by the emancipation of the Jews around 1825. In the 19th century, many Jews were active in processing, cutting and trading diamonds, leading to the first trade union in the Netherlands – the Algemene Nederlandse Diamantbewerkersbond [ "General Dutch Diamond Workers' Union" ], chaired by Henri Polak. Its headquarters, the Beurs van Berlage [ "Berlage Exchange" ], named in honor of its architect Hendrik Petrus Berlage, was in the Plantage.

With the increase of their wealth in the late 19th century and the early 20th century, many of the residents moved out of the Jodenbuurt for the newer neighborhoods, such as the Transvaalbuurt, the Watergraafsmeer [ "Water Count's Lake" ] and the Rivierenbuurt [ "Rivers Neighborhood" ]. After the Leprozengracht and Houtgracht were filled in 1882, the Jodenbuurt market was moved from Jodensbreestraat to the new square, Waterlooplein, and became a popular Sunday attraction for the rest of Amsterdam. The Amsterdam Tram 8 Alliance began in 1906 to run its lines from the Central Station through Nieuwmarkt, Waterlooplein, Weesperplein to Van Woustraat and later the Rivierenbuurt. But Line 8 died in the summer of 1942 after the German occupiers forbade the Jews to ride the trams.

In the 1930s, with the rise of Adolf Hitler, many German Jews fled from the persecutions of the Nazis to the Netherlands but the Dutch government would accept them only if they were in "direct danger of life". In 1933, it also decided that the state would not be responsible for the financial expenses of resettling the Jewish refugees.

=== World War II ===
During the Second World War, the Germans invaded the Netherlands in May 1940 and stayed until May 1945. In 1941, the Jodenbuurt was declared by the Nazis to be the Jewish Ghetto and subjected to ever-increasing restrictions. A big fence was erected around the entire quarter and many bridges were placed under permanent guard to control the comings and goings of the residents. Many other Jews were warehoused in the Transvaalbuurt. On 10 January 1941, all the Jewish citizens had to register with the Nazis. On 6 July 1942, they were not allowed to make any phone calls and receive Gentile visitors. On 23 October 1942, they were prohibited from driving cars and trucks. Three major raids took place in Amsterdam, including the Jodenbuurt, in May, June and September 1943, and from these raids hundreds of Jews were deported to "the East". But many more of them went into hiding with the help of their Christian neighbors and friends and survived the war.

So the Jodenbuurt was virtually empty and it would stay that way until the end of the war. Then came the Hunger Winter of 1944-1945. Many buildings of the Jodenbuurt were demolished by the cold and starving people of Amsterdam to feed their stoves and fireplaces for the cooking and heating. The four Ashkenazi synagogues on the Jonas Daniel Meijer Square were not spared. They were stripped of almost all wood, from the galleries and even three of the four sacred Arks ( aron hakodesh, the cabinets for housing the scrolls of the Torah ). Only the Holy Ark of the Great Synagogue was left alone because it was made of marble, not wood.

The war decimated the Jewish population of Amsterdam. Before the Germans came, there were 80,000 Jews in the whole city but, after they left, there were only 5,000 left. They were the ones who returned from the death camps in Germany and German-occupied Poland. Some of the Dutch saved many more of the Jews in their homes, cloisters and orphanages.

=== After World War II ===
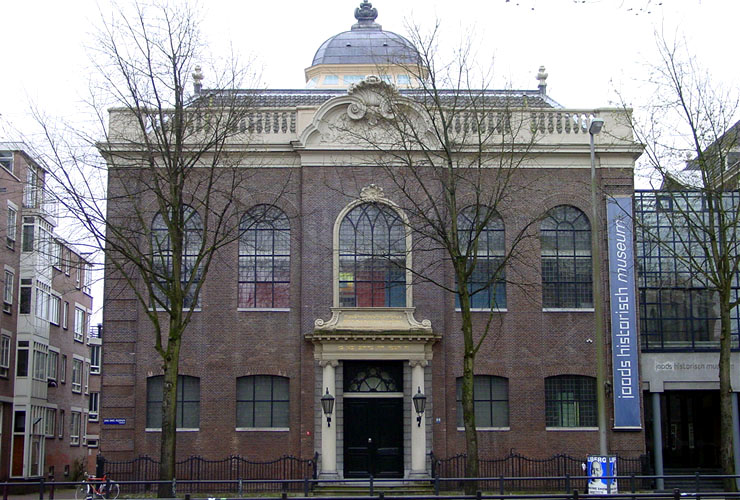
Joods Historisch Museum (Jewish Historical Museum)

After the war, what was once a bustling, thriving neighborhood was largely abandoned and neglected. In 1953 the municipal government made plans for a major renovation, including a large expansion to Weesperstraat and Prins Hendrikkade and the construction of the so-called 'oostlijn' expansion to the Amsterdam Metro. Many houses were demolished and replaced with large apartment blocks and office buildings, including the Maupoleum, built by and named for the Jewish real estate developer Maup Caransa, who had survived the war in the neighborhood and acquired much of it.

Today, little remains of the once-thriving Jewish neighborhood that once existed in the Jodenbuurt; however there are a few surviving monuments from Amsterdam's Jewish history. These include the Jewish Historical Museum and the Portuguese Synagogue. Saved from nearly being demolished in 1975, the Huis de Pinto is a mansion in Sint Antoniesbreestraat that once belonged to a wealthy Portuguese Sephardic family often referred to as the Rothschild family of the Dutch Golden Age.

== See also ==
- Sephardic Jews in the Netherlands

== Gallery ==
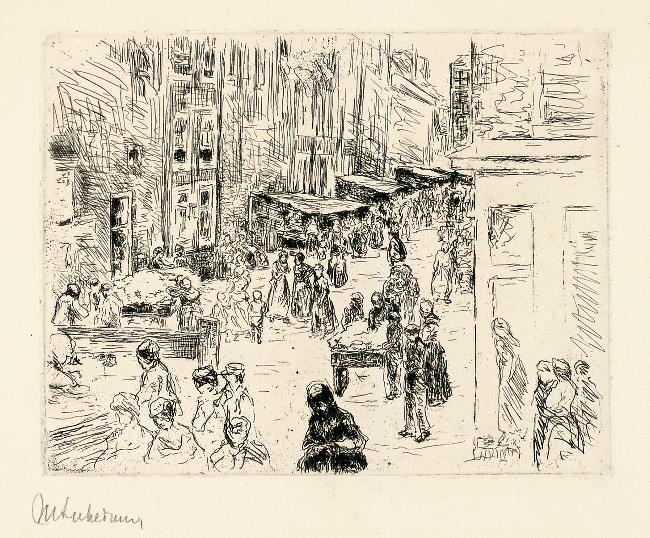
Judenstraße in Amsterdam by Max Liebermann (1906)

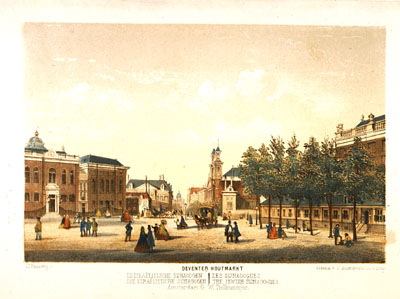
Former 'Deventer Houtmarkt' - now the J.D. Meijerplein - in 1861, painting by Willem Hekking.

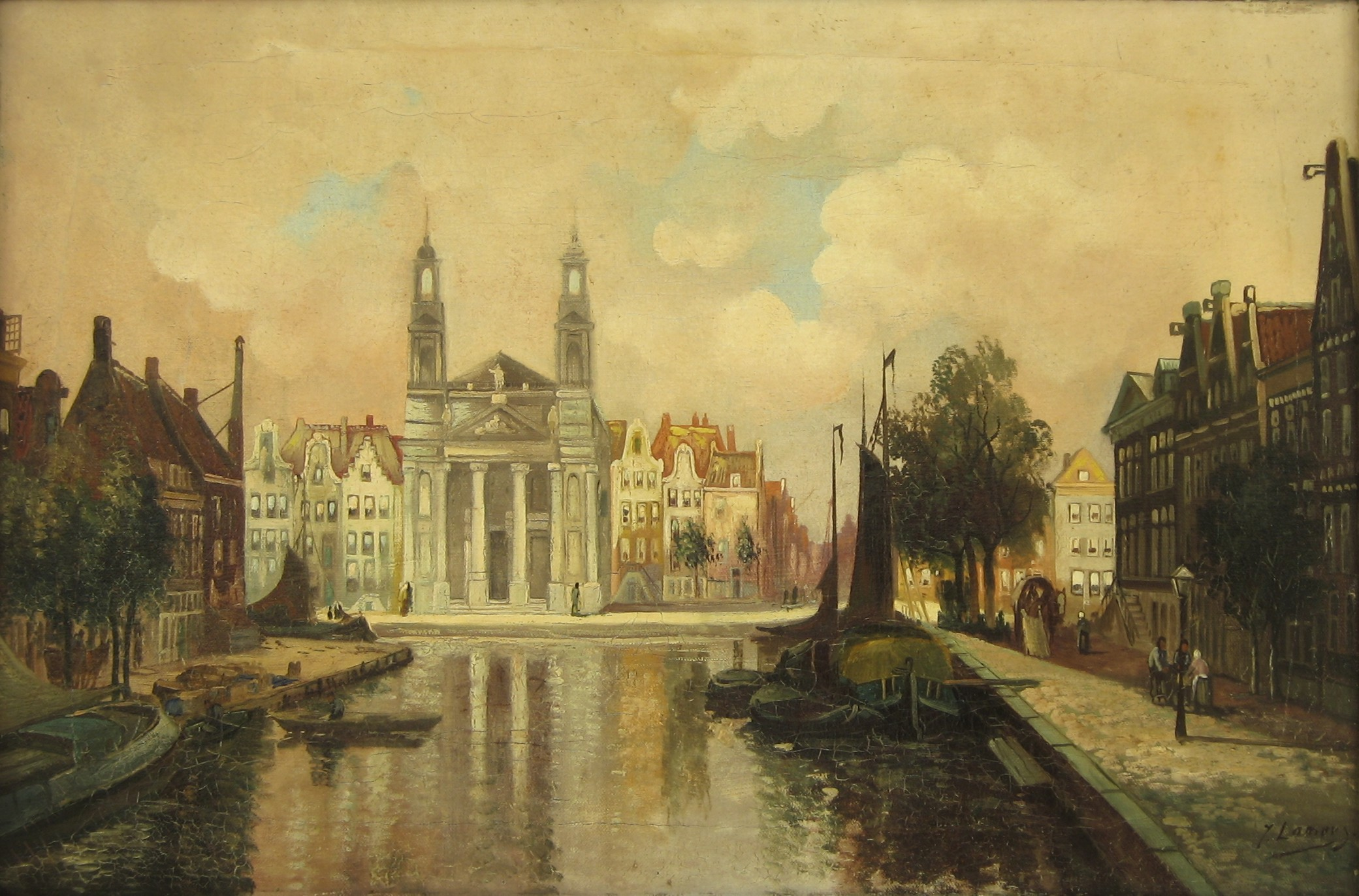
The Leprozengracht (Lepers' canal, since filled in) and in the background the Mozes en Aäronkerk, in the heart of the Jodenbuurt. Painting by J. Lamers from 1895, copied from an original work by Cornelis Christiaan Dommershuizen (1842-1928).

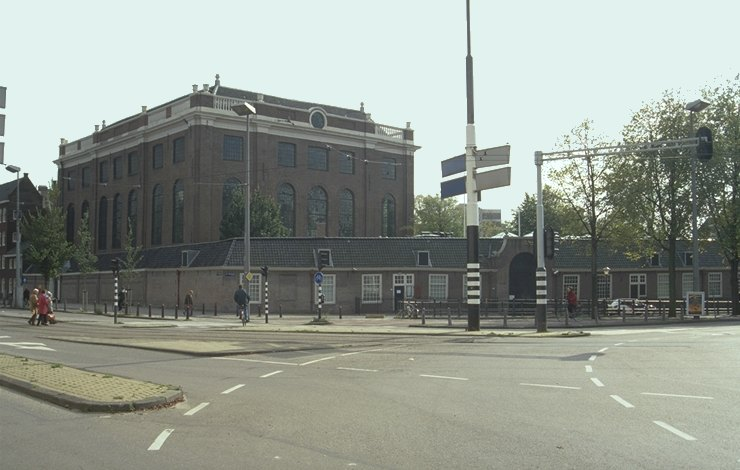
Portuguese Synagogue on Mr. Visserplein square

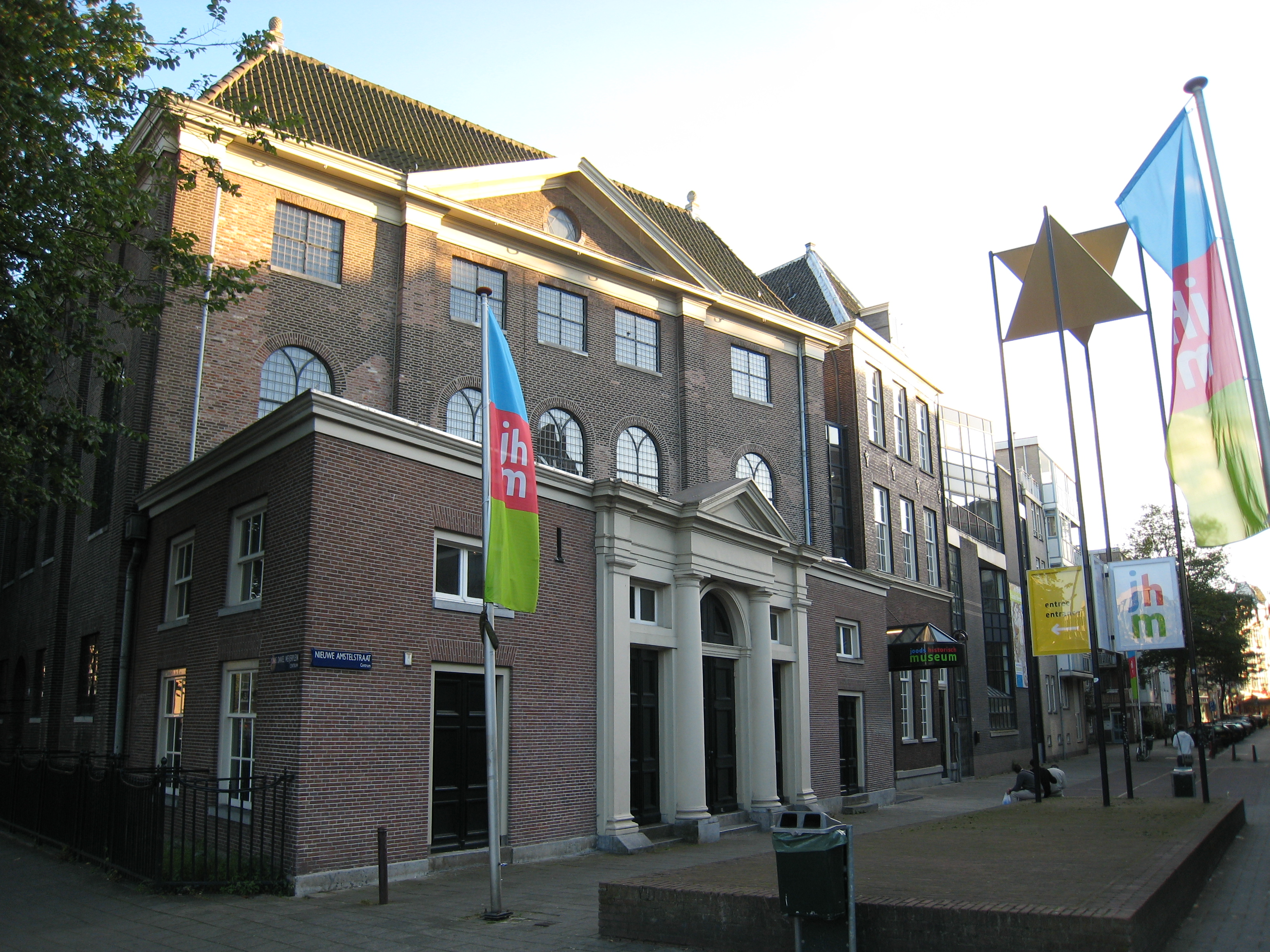
Joods Historisch Museum

== Bibliography ==
- (in Dutch) Ab Caransa, Verzamelen op het Transvaalplein. Ter nagedachtenis van het joodse proletariaat van Amsterdam [ Gathering on the Transvaal Square: In Memory of the Jewish Proletariat of Amsterdam ] (Amsterdam: Bosch & Keuning, 1984), ISBN 90-246-4523-9.
- (in Dutch) Flip ten Cate, Dit volckje seer verwoet: een geschiedenis van de Sint Antoniesbreestraat (Amsterdam: Uitgeverij Pantheon, 1988), ISBN 90-72653-01-7.
- Selma Leydesdorff, author, Frank Heny, translator, We Lived With Dignity: The Jewish Proletariat of Amsterdam 1900-1940 (Detroit: Wayne State University Press, 1994), ISBN 0-8143-2338-3
- Steven Nadler, Rembrandt's Jews (Chicago: University of Chicago Press, 2003), ISBN 0-226-56736-2
- (in German) Barbara Beuys, „Leben mit dem Feind“. Amsterdam unter deutscher Besatzung 1940-1945 [ "Living with the Enemy", Amsterdam under German Occupation 1940-1945 ] (Munich: Carl Hanser Verlag, 2012), ISBN 9783446240711
