= Leprozengracht =

Canal in Amsterdam

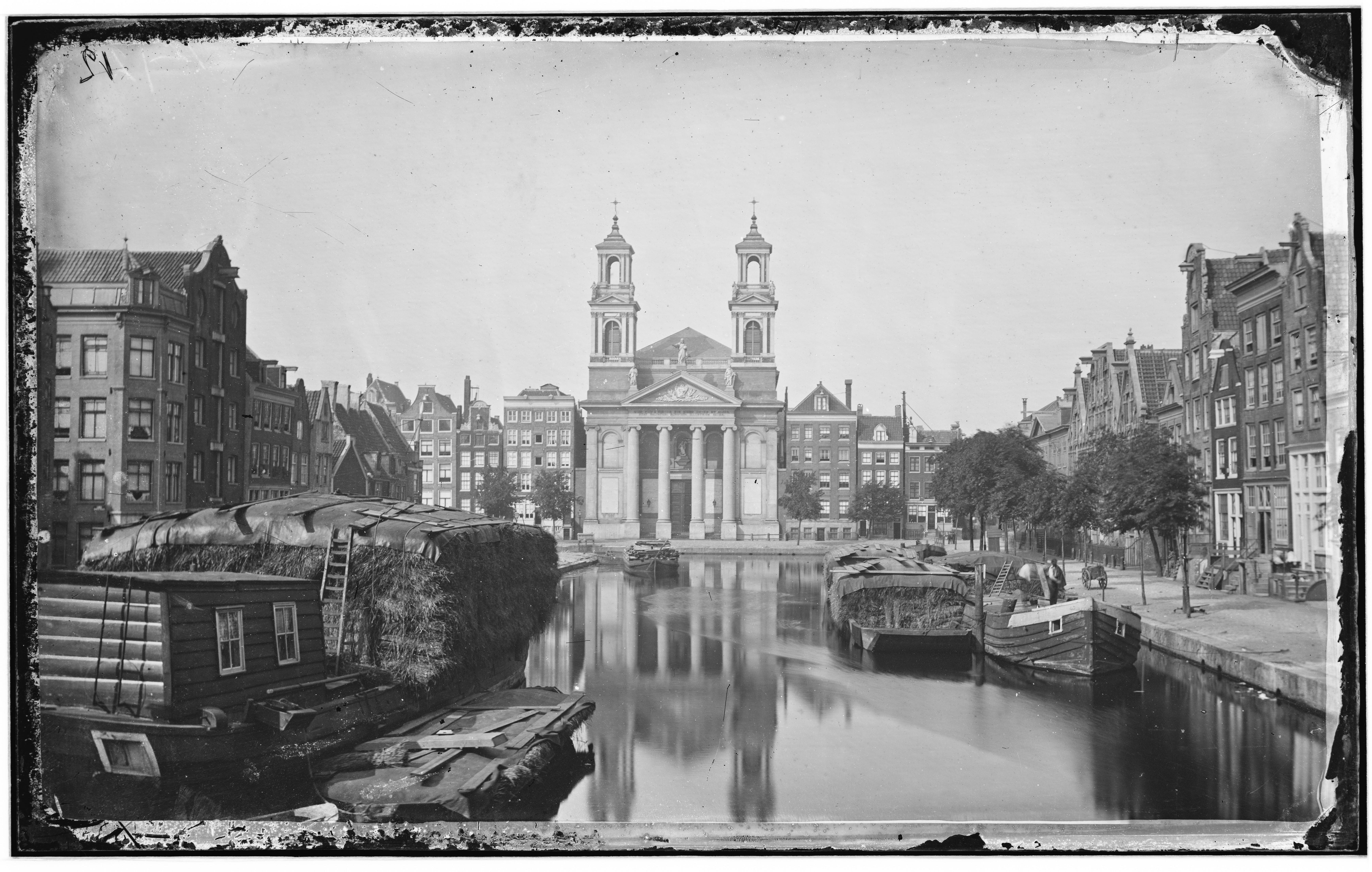
- Leprozengracht looking northeast to the Mozes en Aäronkerk on the Houtgracht

- Location within Amsterdam
- Location: Amsterdam
- Coordinates: 52.367340°N 4.902323°E
- Southeast end: Amstel
- To: Houtgracht

Construction
- Inauguration: 1593
- Demolished: 1882

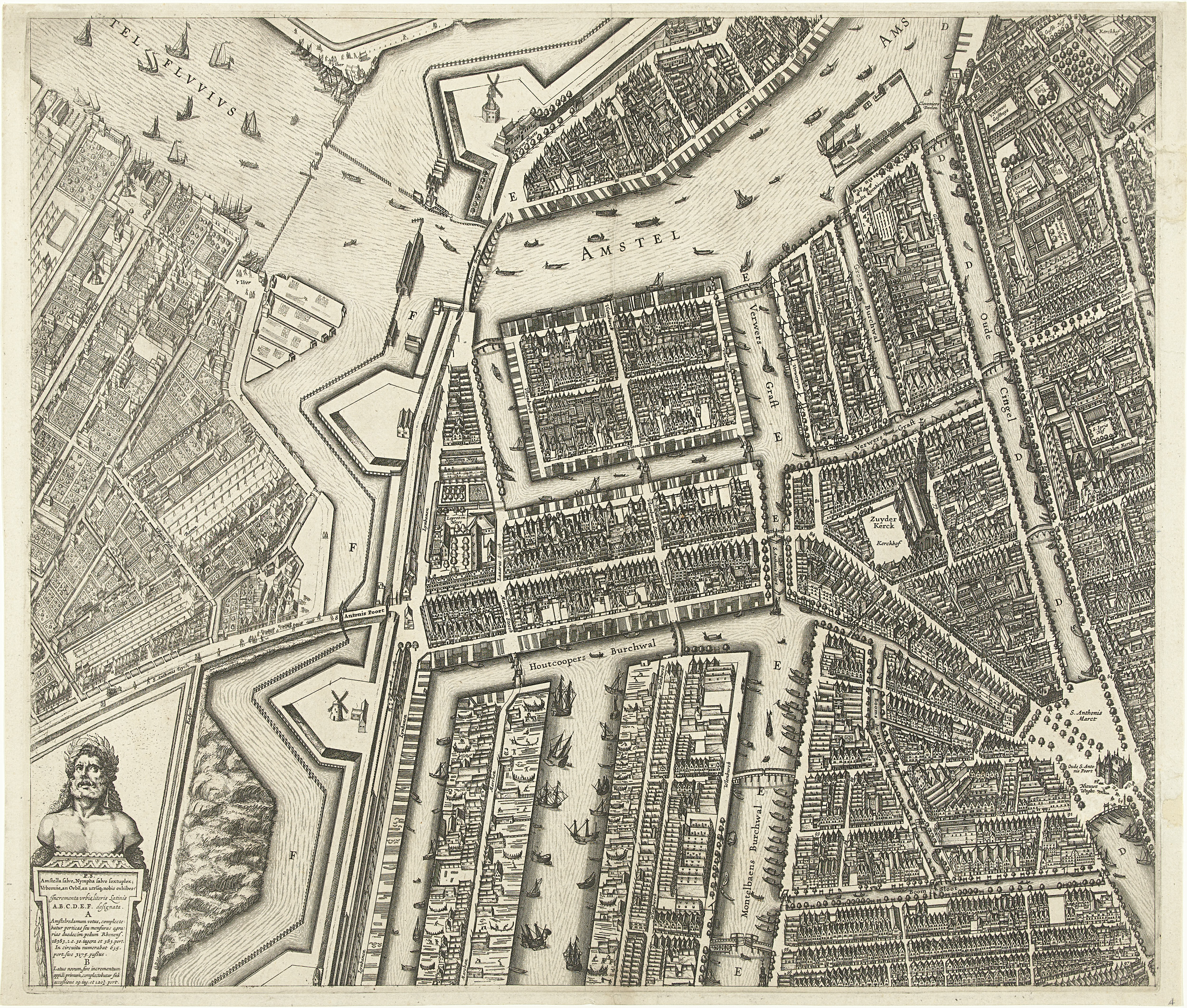
Balthasar Florisz. van Berckenrode - Amsterdam (1625). North at bottom. Vlooyenburg is the rectangular island just above the center. Leprozengracht to the left (E), Houtgracht below (N), Verwerfsgracht to the right (W).

The Leprozengracht was a canal in Amsterdam that defined one side of the Vlooienburg island. Leprozengracht and the connected Houtgracht canal were filled in 1882 to form the Waterlooplein.

== History ==
The Sint Anthoniusgasthuis, or Sint Nicolaasgasthuis, a leper house, was established on the land between Sint Anthoniesdijk and Amstel in the 14th century. In the late 16th century it was decided to expand the old city of Amsterdam by creating a new island in this area. The new island was called Vlooienburg, a reference to the regular flooding of the area from the Amstel, and was surrounded by the Amstel, Leprozengracht, Houtgracht and Verwerfsgracht (Zwanenburgwal). With the expansion, the leper house came to be within the city, and gave its name to the canal. The canal was also known as the Leprozen Graft, Leprozenburgwal and Turfgracht. It was crossed by the Muiderbrug along the Amstel bank.

Vlooienburg was raised up during the second expansion of Amsterdam between 1592 and 1596 as a place to store wood, and blocks of houses were soon added. From the start, three Portuguese Jewish congregations built their synagogues on the island. The congregations united in 1639. In the 1870s the houses along the canal were occupied by, among others, a furniture maker, teacher of religion, insurance broker, kosher cafe-restaurant, corn cutter and tailor. Between 1837 and 1841 a church was built opposite the end of the canal dedicated to Saint Anthony of Padua, designed by Tilman-François Suys. The church became known as the Mozes en Aäronkerk.

The city council decided to fill in the Leprozengracht and Houtgracht on 28 January 1874. Both canals were filled in 1882. The park that replaced the canals was officially named Waterlooplein in December 1883. It was made into a Jewish market. The street traders from around Jodenbreestraat had to move to the new square. They were opposed to the move, thinking the square was too windy and no customers would come. The former island is now the home of the Amsterdam "Stopera" building complex.

== Gallery ==
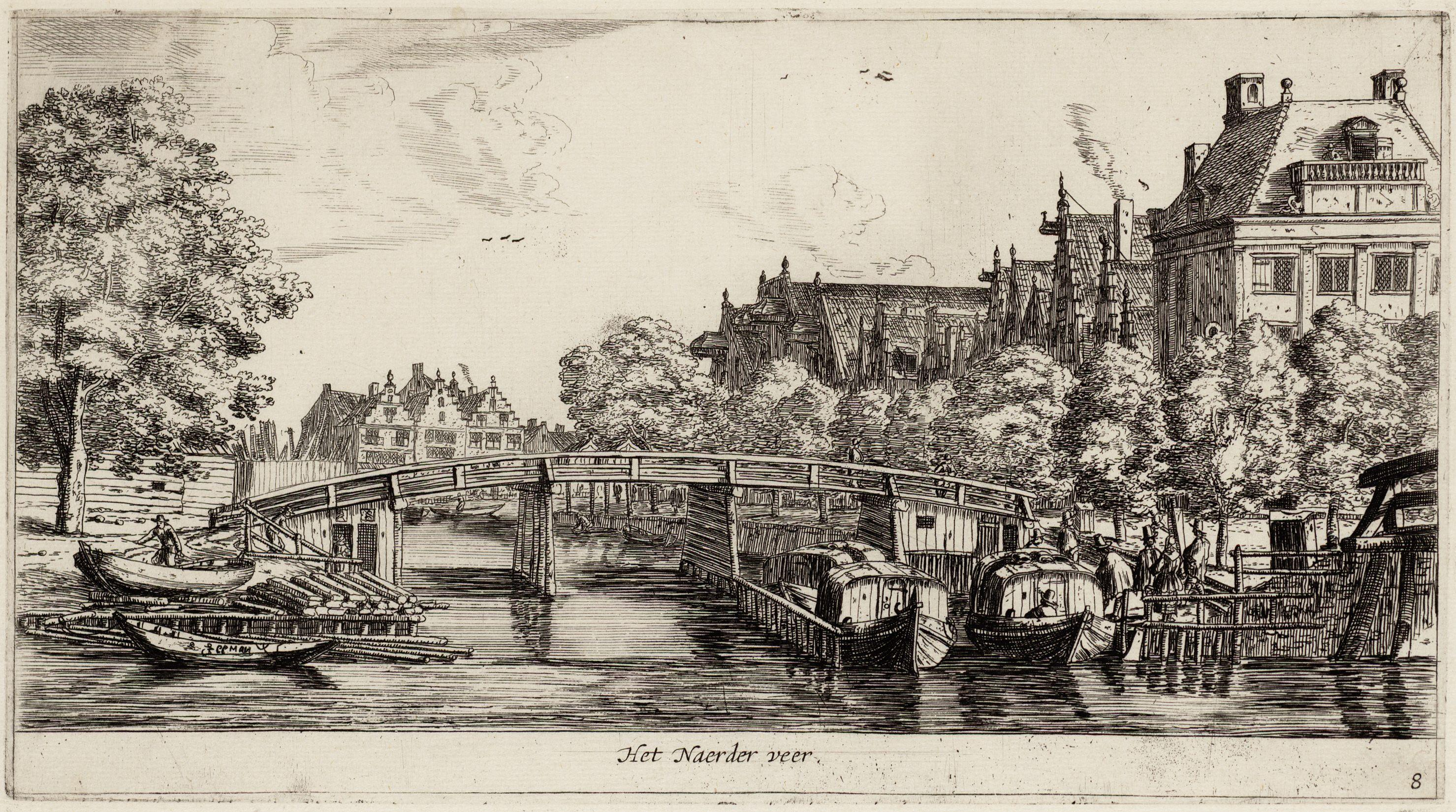
The Naarderveer on the Amstel on the corner with the Leprozengracht. On the right a small part of the Blauwbrug. c. 1659

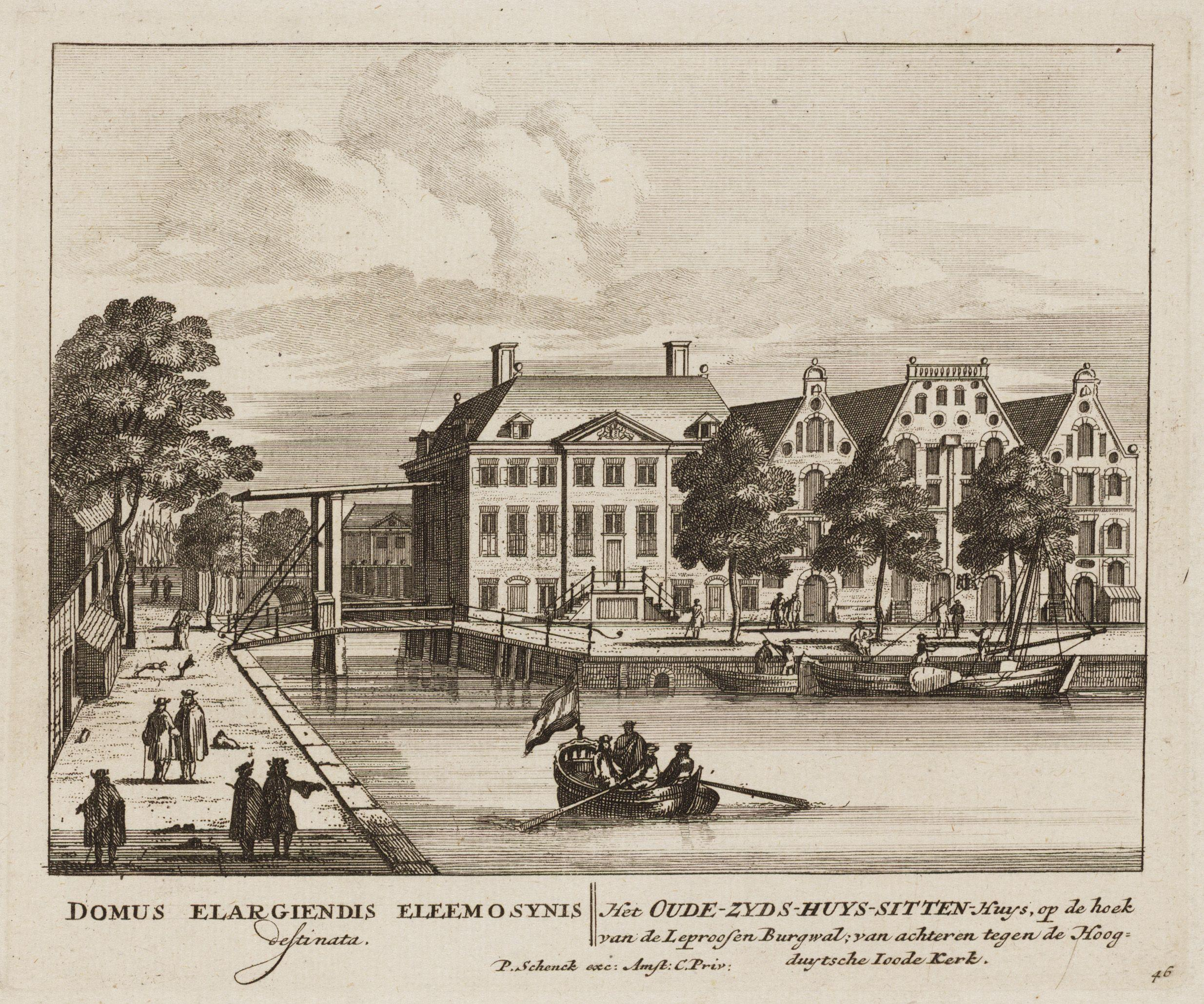
The Oudezijds Huiszittenhuis on the Leprozengracht with the Arsenaal on the right. Seen along the Houtgracht to the Leprozengracht, with the Portuguese-Israelite Synagogue in the distance. c. 1710

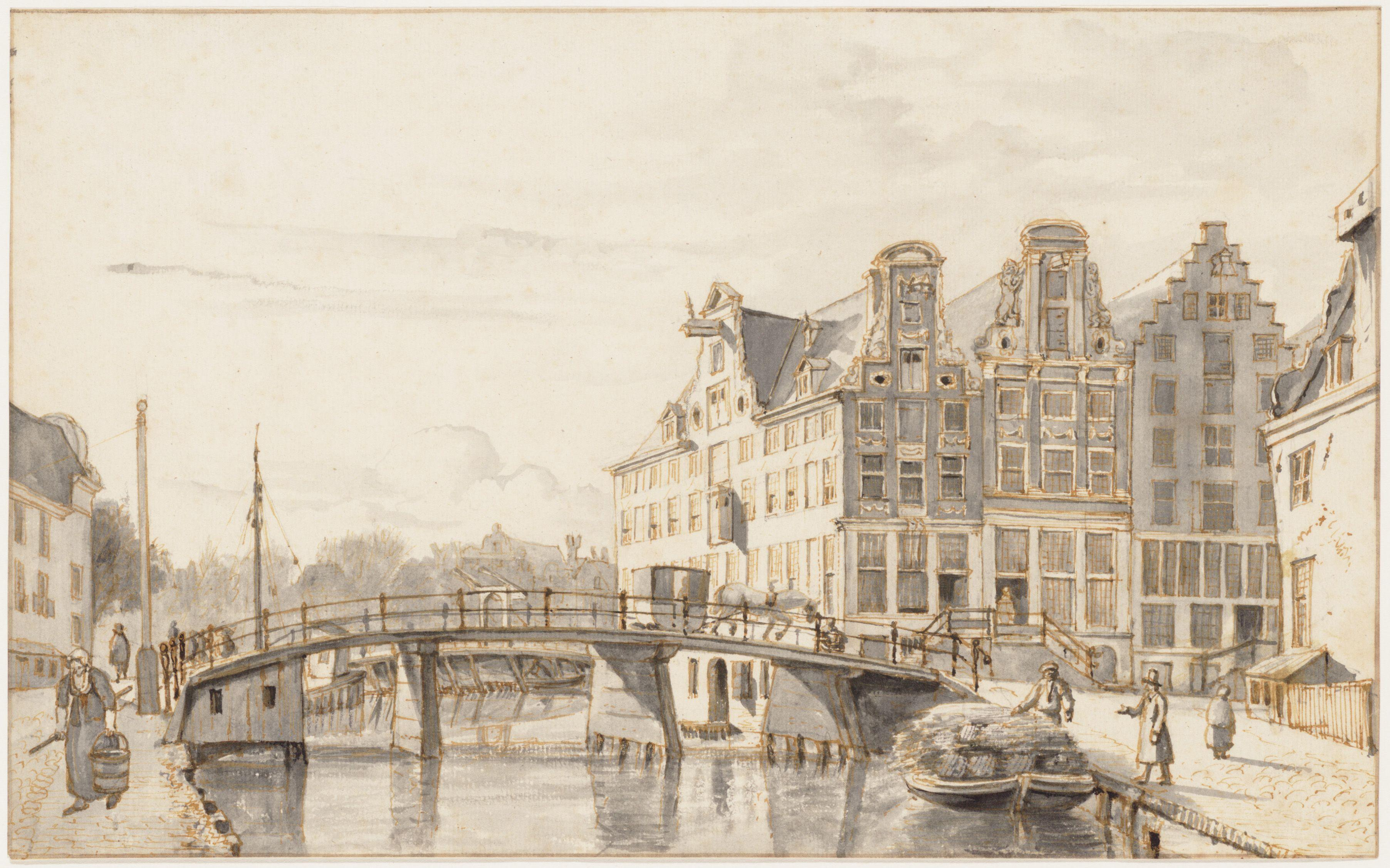
Leprozengracht looking southwest towards Zwanenburgerstraat Gerrit Lamberts 1830

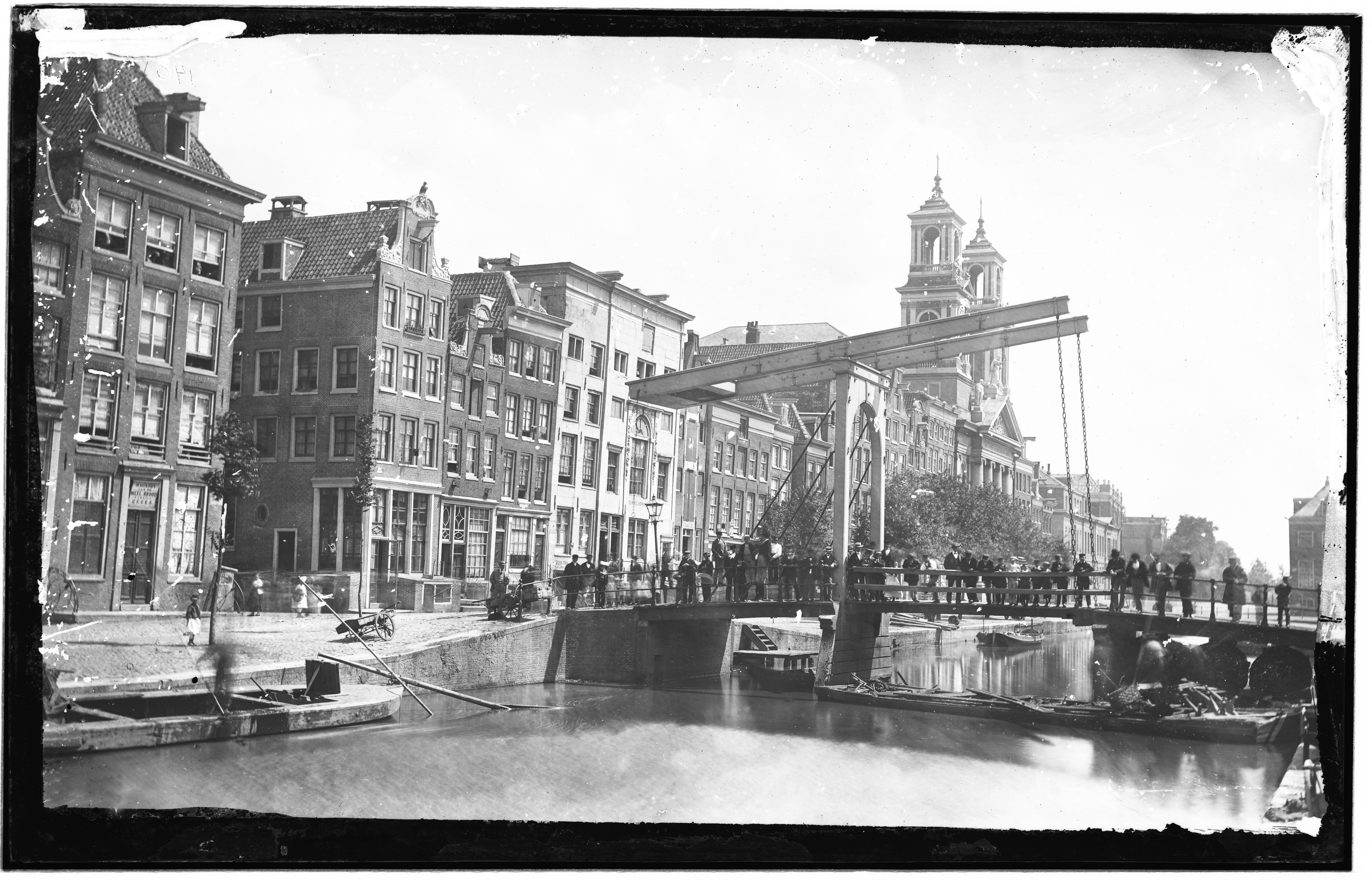
Houtgracht looking southeast to Mozes en Aäronkerk and Leprozengracht

== Sources ==
- "400 jaar Amsterdamse grachten: De Houtgracht en Leprozengracht", De Echo, 20 February 2013
- "Amsterdam, Vlooienburg quarter", Spinozaweb
- J. Kruizinga Gerrit Vermeer (2002), "Leprozengracht", XYZ van Amsterdam
- "Leprozengracht", Adamlink
- "Leprozengracht", Joodsamsterdam (in Dutch), 17 December 2016
- "Muiderbrug in de Binnen Amstel over de Leprozengracht", Alle Amsterdamse bruggen
- Theo Bakker, Vlooienburg & Zwanenburg (PDF)
