= Houtgracht =

Canal in Amsterdam

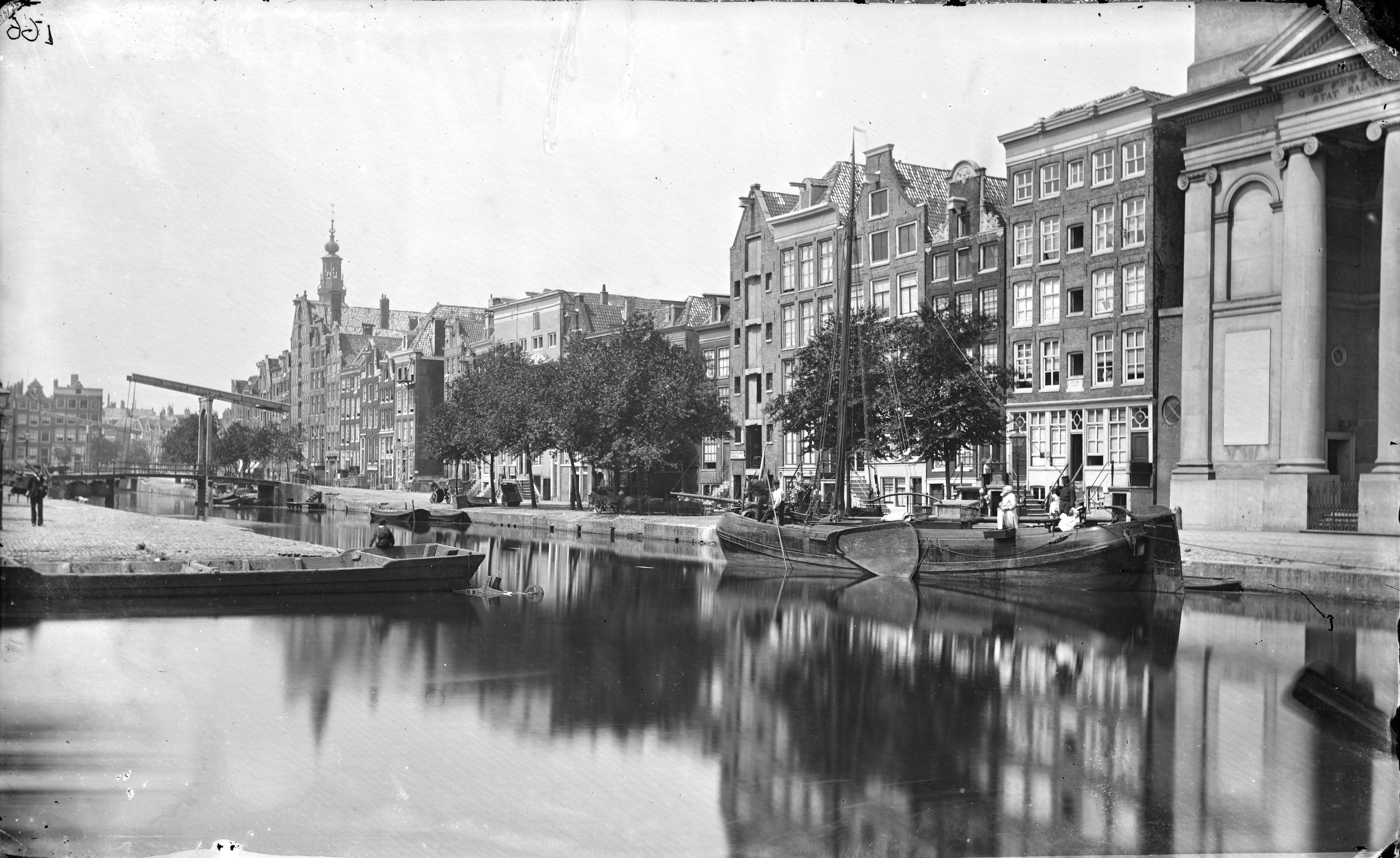
- Looking west from Mozes en Aäronkerk (right) along Houtgracht (1867)

- Location within Amsterdam
- Location: Amsterdam
- Coordinates: 52.368391°N 4.901910°E
- East end: Nieuwe Herengracht
- To: Verwerfsgracht (Zwanenburgwal)

Construction
- Inauguration: 1593
- Demolished: 1882

The Houtgracht (Dutch pronunciation: [ˈɦʌutˌxrɑxt]; Wood Canal) was a canal in Amsterdam that defined one side of Vlooienburg island. Houtgracht and the connected Leprozengracht canal were filled in 1882 to form the Waterlooplein.

== History ==
In the late 16th century it was decided to expand the old city of Amsterdam by creating a new island on the land between Sint Anthoniesdijk and the Amstel. Vlooienburg was raised up during the second expansion of Amsterdam between 1592 and 1596 as a place for lumberyards, which gave the Houtgracht canal its name. Blocks of houses were soon added. The new island was called Vlooyenburg in a reference to the regular flooding from the Amstel that the area had previously experienced. It was surrounded by the Amstel, Leprozengracht, Houtgracht and Verwerfsgracht (Zwanenburgwal). In a 1597 map by Pieter Bast the island is shown without any trees, buildings or roads, connected to the mainland by a bridge over the east end of the Houtgracht.

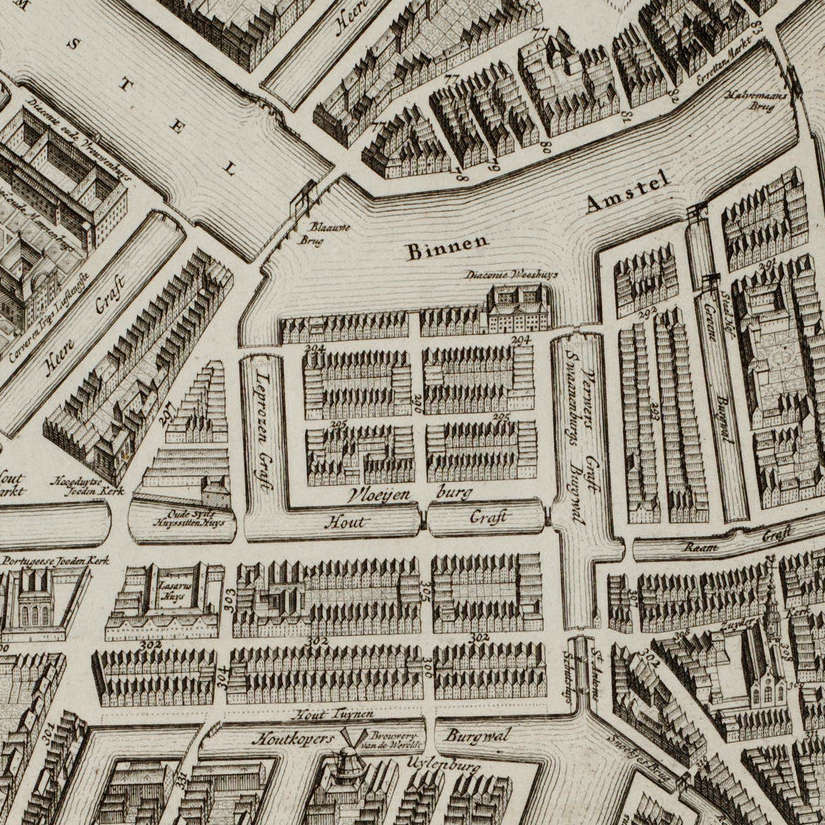
Gerrit de Broen - Amsterdam (1737). North at bottom. Vlooyenburg is the rectangular island in the center. Leprozengracht to the left (E), Houtgracht below (N) running east to Heere Graght, Verwerfsgracht to the right (W).

Three Portuguese Jewish congregations soon built synagogues on the island. Jacob Tirado, one of the founders of the Spanish-Portuguese Sephardic community of Amsterdam, acquired a house on the Houtgracht which he transformed it into Amsterdam's first synagogue. It was called Beth Jacob after him, and was consecrated at the Jewish New Year's festival in September 1597. Houtgracht 208 was the site of another of the oldest synagogues, Talmud Torah. The congregations united in 1639. In the early 1650s Baruch Spinoza's father Michael d'Espinosa rented a brick house on the corner of the Houtgracht and Leprozengracht, and this is where the philosopher grew up. In the 1870s other houses along the canal were used by a silversmith, father of the trade unionist Sientje Prijes, a liquor dealer, a vendor of furniture and stoves, a hardware company, the Bet Israel synagogue (Houtgracht 37–39) and a refresher school.

A 1625 map by Balthasar Florisz. van Berckenrode shows the Houtgracht canal ran east from the Verwerfsgracht from a point roughly opposite the Raamgracht, and ended where it joined the Leprozengracht. Beyond the end there was a garden and orchard, then the Lynbanen, city ramparts and moat. A 1737 map by Gerrit de Broen shows the fortifactions and moat had been moved much further east. Hout Graft had been extended east past Leprozengraft, leading into the Muyder Graft (Plantage Muidergracht). The connection to the Muyder Graght past Heere Graght (Nieuwe Herengracht) is still shown on an 1835 map. The Houtgracht connected the Zwanenburgwal to the Nieuwe Herengracht until 1870, when the section that is now the Jonas Daniël Meijerplein was filled in.

The city council decided to fill in the rest of the Houtgracht and Leprozengracht on 28 January 1874. Both canals were filled in 1882. The park that replaced the canals was officially named Waterlooplein in December 1883. It was made into a Jewish market. The street traders from around Jodenbreestraat had to move to the new square. They complained that the square was too windy and no customers would come. The former island is now the home of the Amsterdam "Stopera" building complex.

== Gallery ==
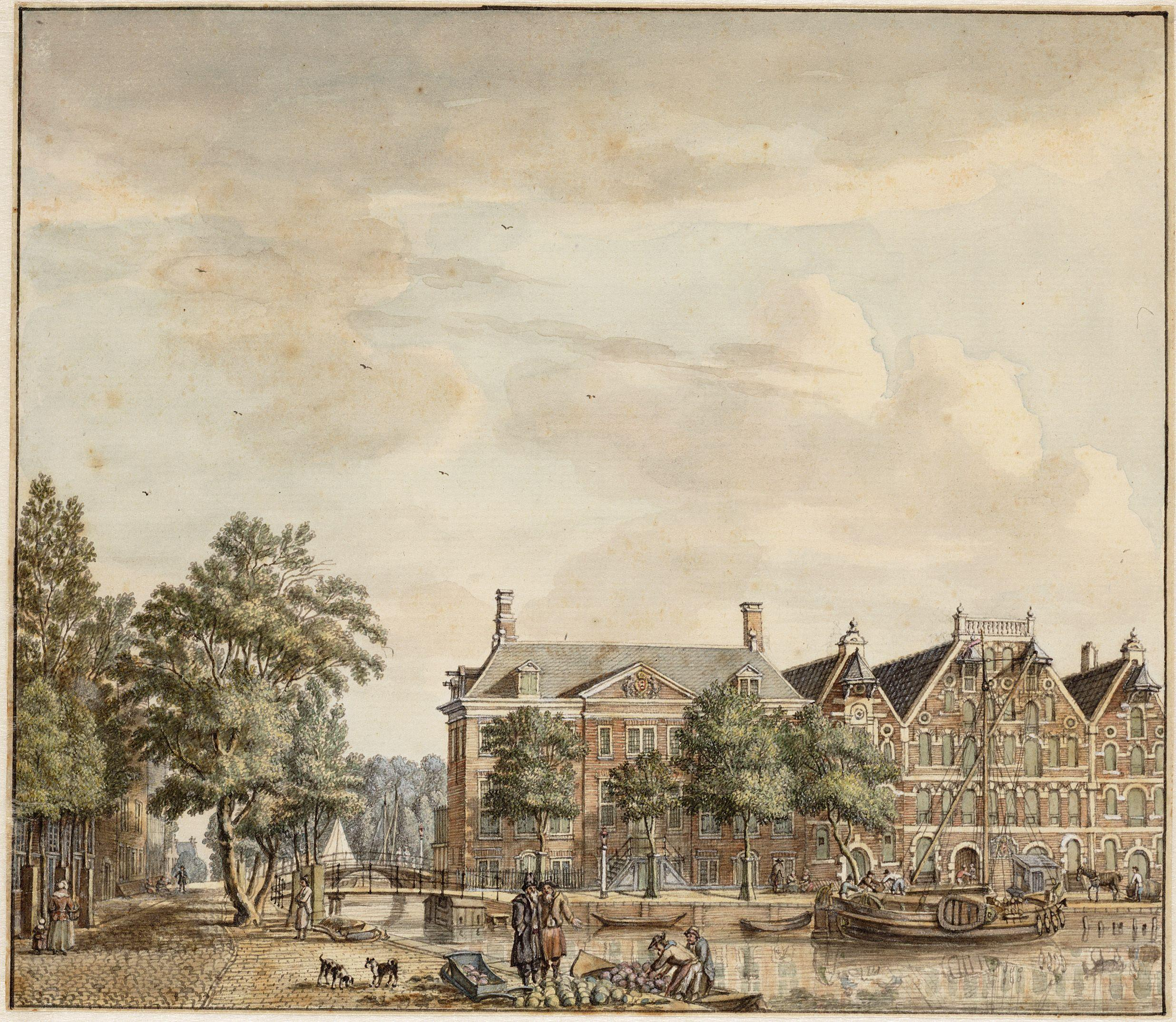
Looking east: Houtgracht (left) and Leprozengracht (right). In the middle the Oudezijds Huiszittenhuis. 1759

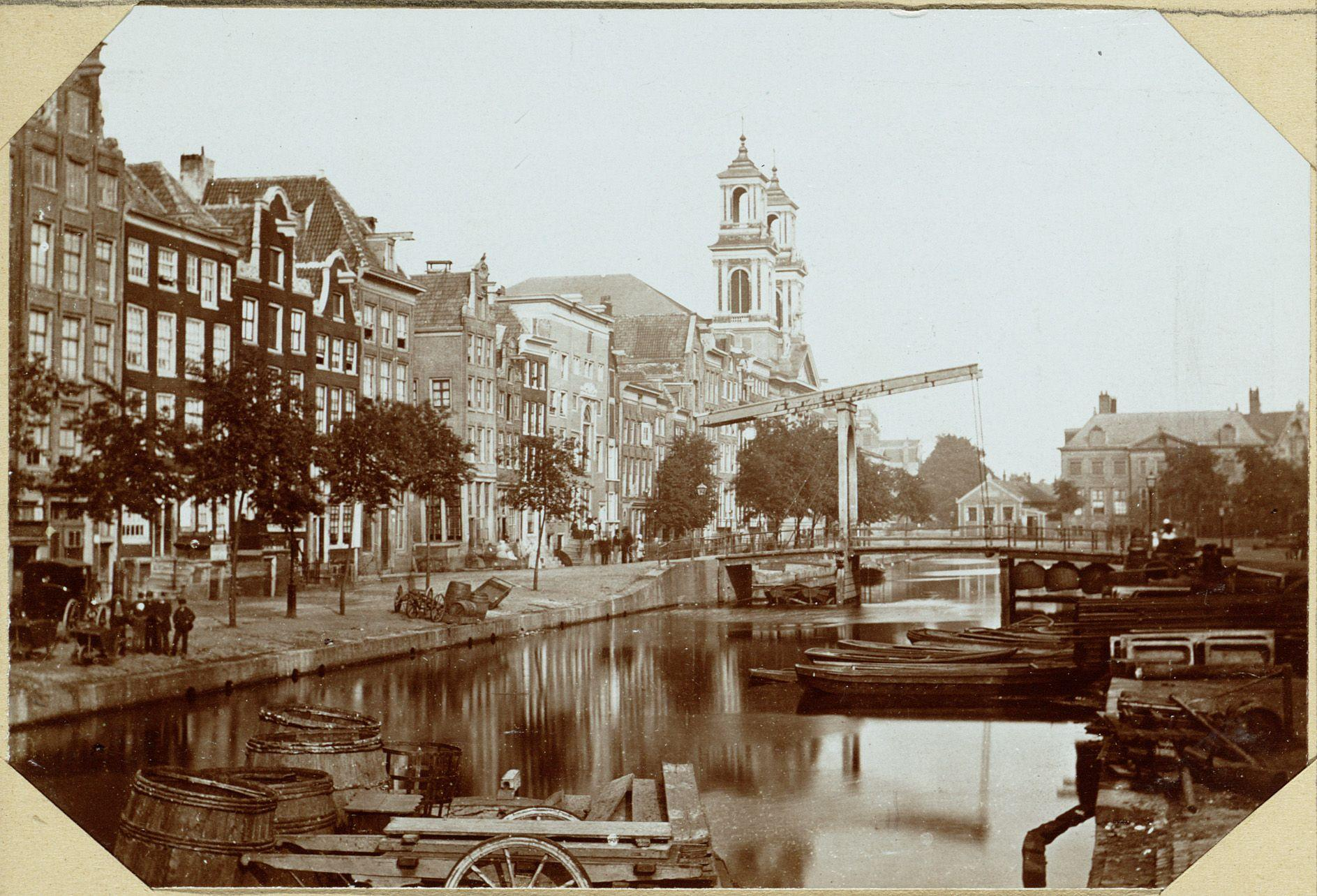
Houtgracht looking east towards Mozes and Aäron church (left) with the bridge between Vlooienburgersteeg (Houtkopersdwarsstraat) and Korte Houtstraat. c. 1867

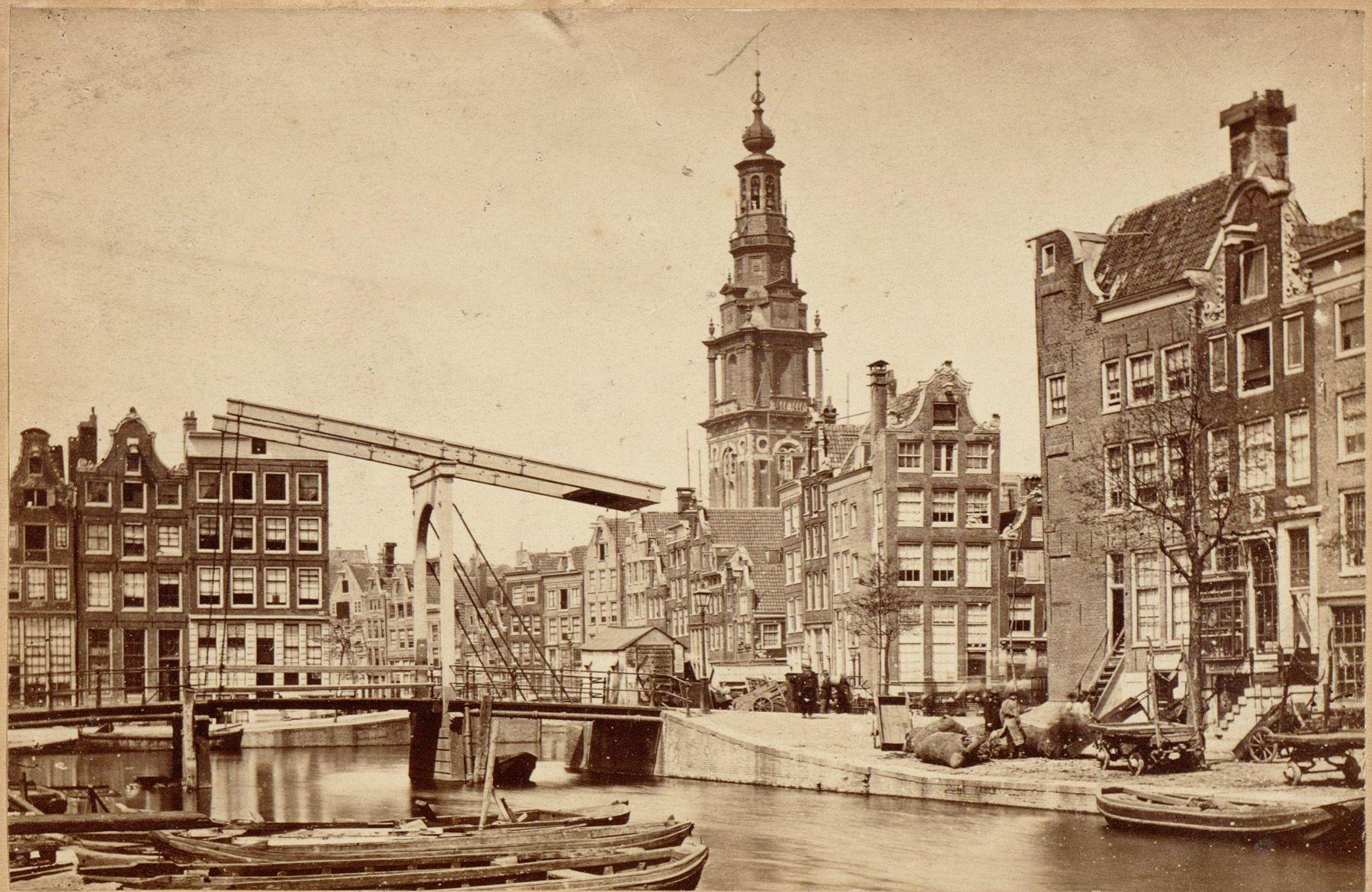
Houtgracht looking west towards Raamgracht. Background: Zuiderkerk tower, and to the left the Zwanenburgwal. 1867

== Sources ==
- "400 jaar Amsterdamse grachten: De Houtgracht en Houtgracht", De Echo, 20 February 2013
- "Amsterdam, Houtgracht", spinozaweb.org
- "Amsterdam, Vlooienburg quarter", Spinozaweb
- García-Arenal, Mercedes; Wiegers, Gerard (2007), A Man of Three Worlds: Samuel Pallache, a Moroccan Jew in Catholic and Protestant Europe, Baltimore: Johns Hopkins University Press, p. 58
- Gerrit de Broen (1737), Amsterdam
- "Houtgracht", Joodsamsterdam (in Dutch)
- J. Kruizinga Gerrit Vermeer (2002), "Houtgracht", XYZ van Amsterdam
- J. Kruizinga Gerrit Vermeer (2002b), "Leprozengracht", XYZ van Amsterdam
- Pieter Bast (1597), Amstelredam
- Theo Bakker, Vlooienburg & Zwanenburg (PDF)
- van Berckenrode, Balthasar Florisz. (1625), Amsterdam
- W B. Clarke / B. R. Davies (1835), Amsterdam, Society for the Diffusion of Useful Knowledge
