= Mozes en Aäronkerk =

Historic Roman Catholic church in Amsterdam, Netherlands

Moses and Aaron Catholic Church Saint Anthony of Padua Catholic Church Mozes en Aäronkerk, Sint-Anthoniuskerk
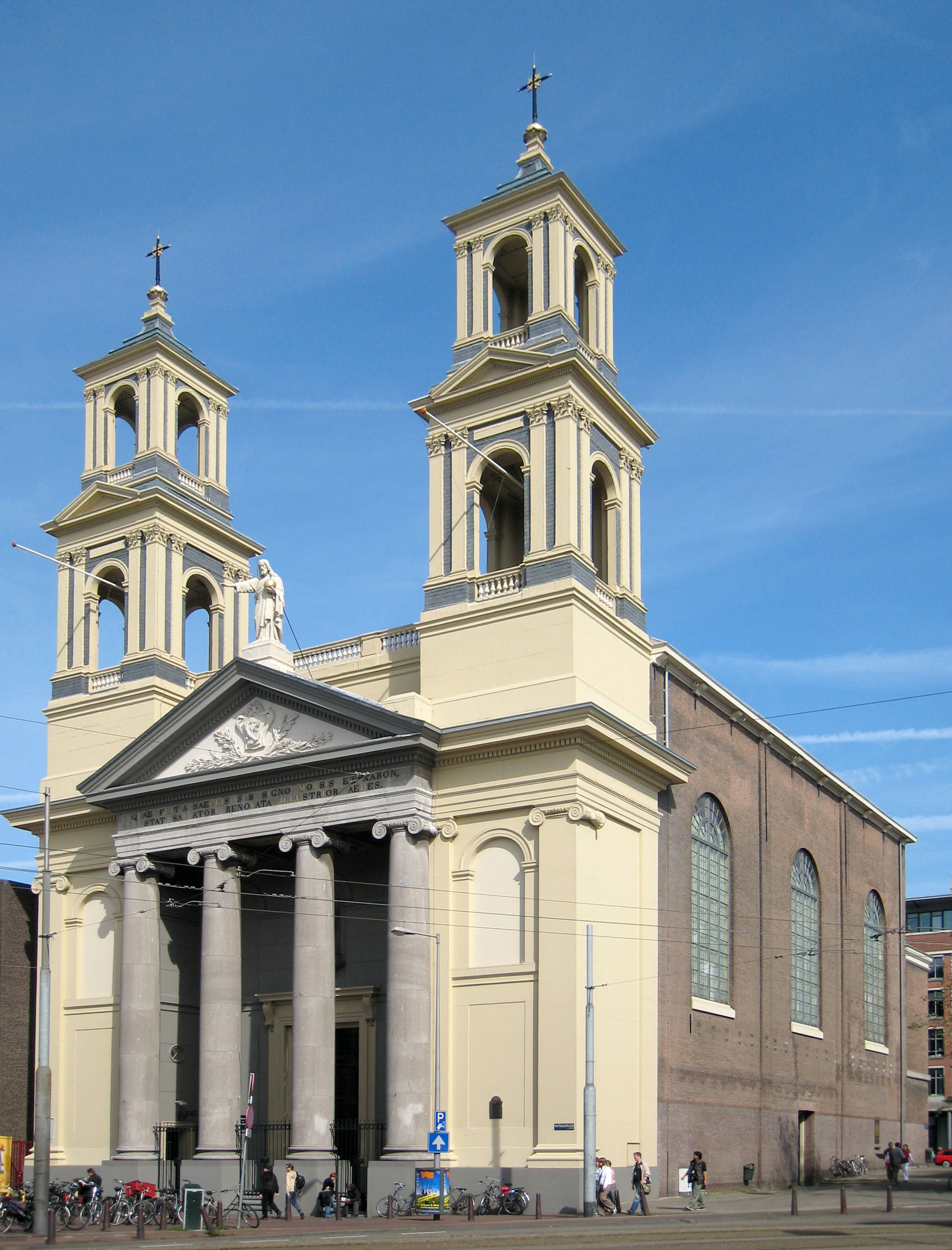
- Mozes en Aäronkerk at the Waterlooplein

Religion
- Affiliation: Roman Catholic
- Province: Diocese of Haarlem-Amsterdam
- Rite: Latin Rite
- Ecclesiastical or organisational status: parish church
- Year consecrated: 1841
- Status: Reconsecrated in 2014

Location
- Location: Amsterdam, Netherlands
- Municipality: Amsterdam
- State: North Holland
- Interactive map of Moses and Aaron Catholic Church; Saint Anthony of Padua Catholic Church; Mozes en Aäronkerk, Sint-Anthoniuskerk
- Coordinates: 52°22′05″N 4°54′11″E

Architecture
- Architect: Tilman-François Suys
- Type: Church
- Style: Neoclassic, Baroque
- General contractor: Johannes A. van Straaten
- Groundbreaking: 1837
- Completed: 1841
- Direction of façade: southwest

Website
- mozesenaaronkerk.nl

The Moses and Aaron Church (Dutch: Mozes en Aäronkerk, pronounced [ˈmoːzəs ɛn aːˈʔaːrɔŋkɛr(ə)k]) in the Waterlooplein neighborhood of Amsterdam, the Netherlands, is officially the Roman Catholic Church of St. Anthony of Padua (Dutch: Sint-Anthoniuskerk). Originally a clandestine church, it was operated by Franciscan priests at a house on Jodenbreestraat ("Jewish Broad Street"), where the wall tablets of Moses and Aaron hung on the wall. In 1970, the present church was designated as a Cultural Heritage Monument (Rijksmonument) of the Netherlands.

== History ==
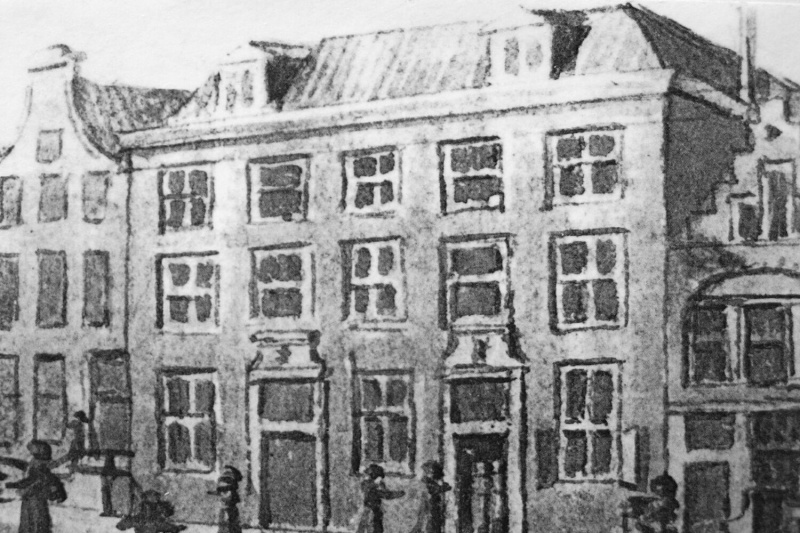
Entrance of the Mozes en Aäronkerk from 1649 to 1690 before it was moved to the Houtgracht.

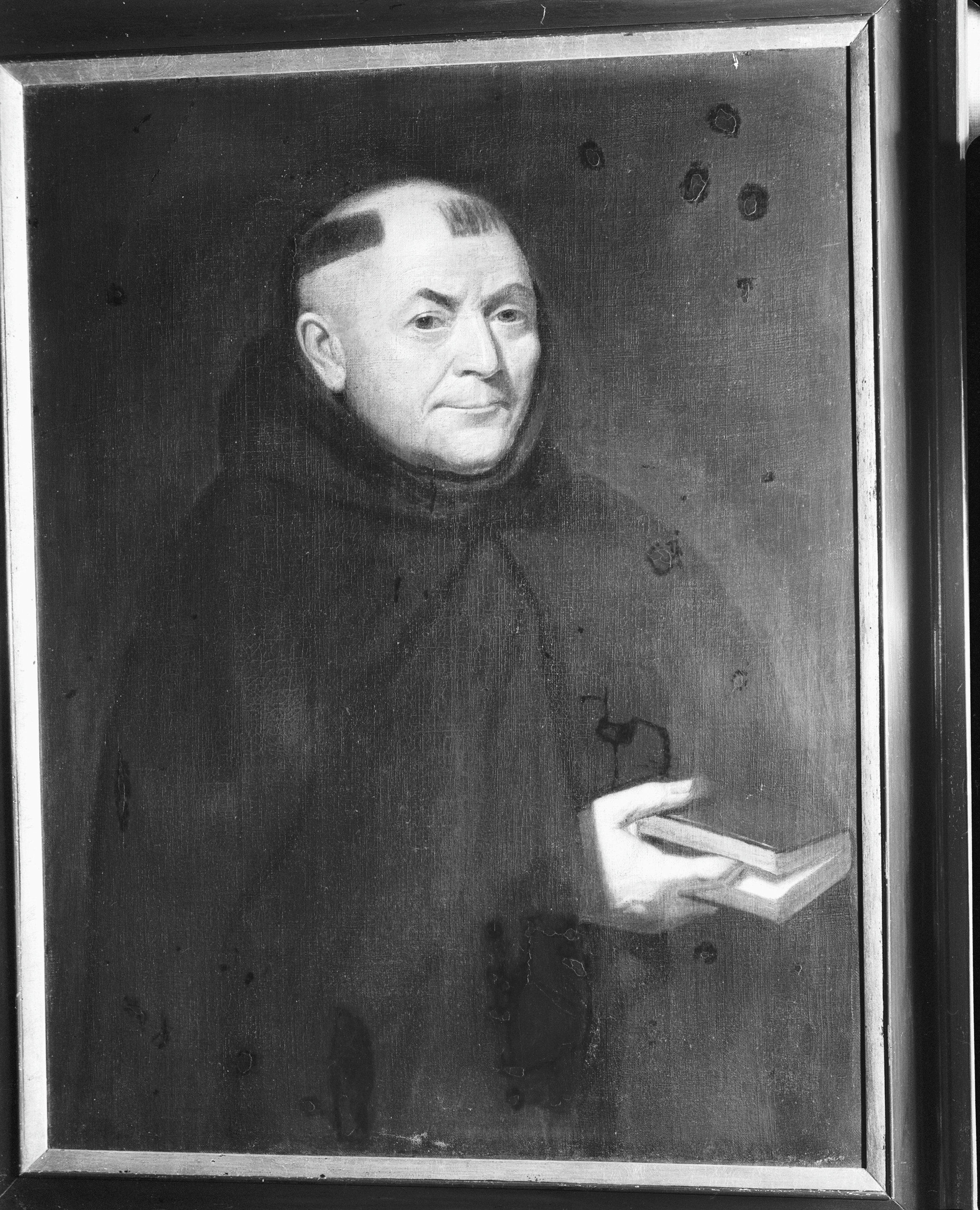
Cornelis de Vroom, till 1687 (?) pastor in the Mozes- en Aäronkerk

In the first centuries after the Reformation, the public display of Roman Catholic services and accessories was not tolerated – officially forbidden in 1660 – in Amsterdam. So in 1641 the Franciscans went to the Joodenbuurt ["Jewish Quarter"], then at the outskirts of the east side of Amsterdam, and opened a house church, the second of its kind in the city, at a house called the "Moyses" (Moses), at the back of the present church. In 1682, the house was joined by the neighboring house "Aäron" (Aaron) with the purchase by Dr. Johannes de Vroom, a physician from Breda, as well as by the house behind it on the Houtgracht ["Wood Canal"]. Subsequently, also in 1682, a neighboring property owned by David Torres was bought by an intermediary. Named after the brothers from the Old Testament, the twin houses proved to be better known than their hidden church, Sint-Anthoniuskerk, which had been dedicated to the church's patron saint, St. Anthony of Padua. In 1690, Johannes de Vroom, brother of the priest, consolidated all the four properties into a single block. In the meantime, the expansion of the church had already begun, before the sale was made and before permission was obtained from the City Council. The entrance was moved from Jodenbreestraat to the Houtgracht. The church was decorated inside and outside, including a new facade, in 1759. But it remained hidden under the gables of the two houses until the early 19th century, when the prohibitions against the Catholic Church were finally lifted. It was replaced between 1837 and 1841 by a bigger and grander building on the same site. Mozes en Aäronkerk was raised to the rank of parish under its original name, St. Anthony of Padua, in 1857, four years after the Roman Catholic hierarchy was restored to the Netherlands.

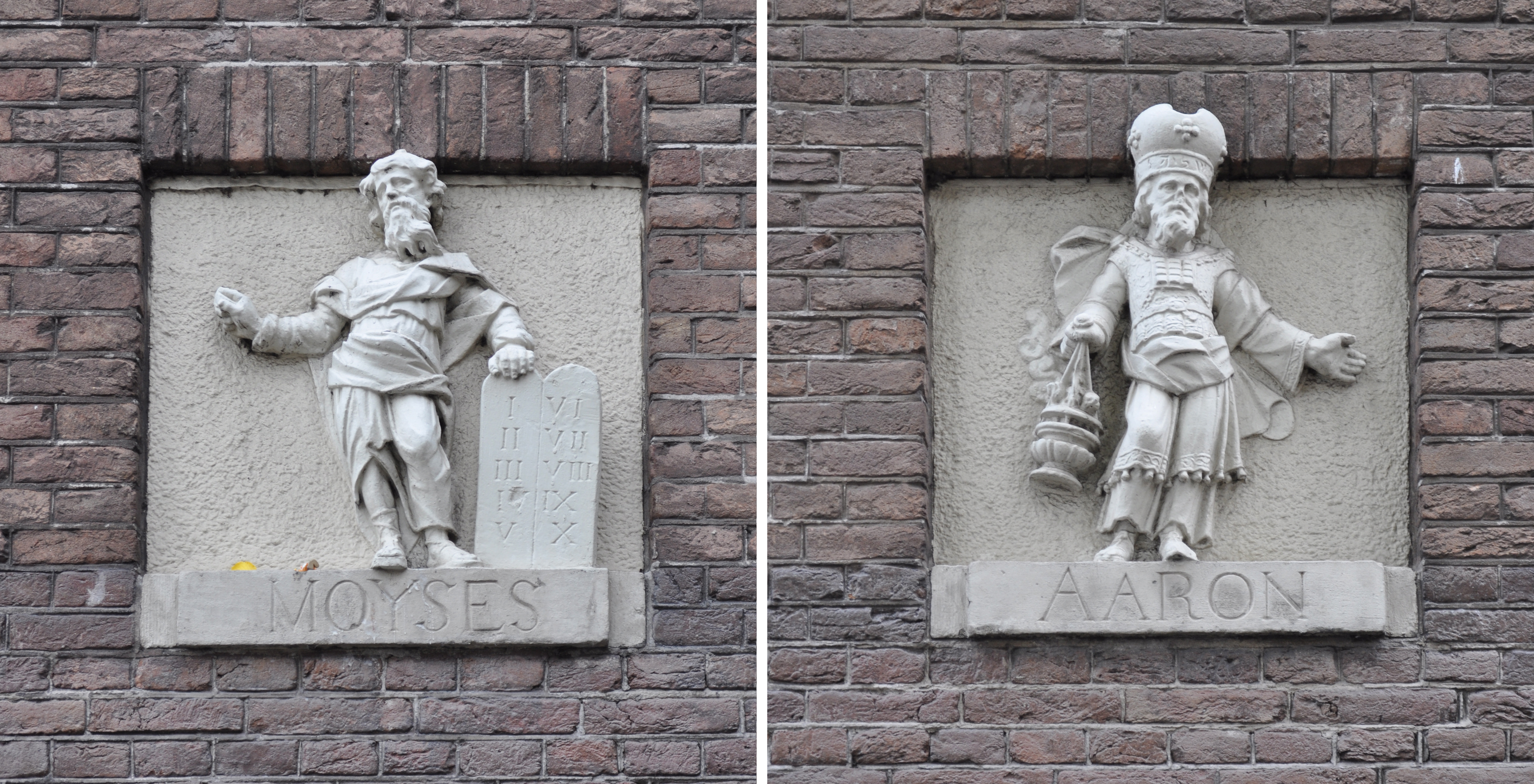
Gable stones of Moses (left; in Latin MOYSES) and Aaron (right) at Jodenbreestraat

But gradually the church's parishioners deserted for other parts of Amsterdam and the second oldest of the city's Catholic parishes became the least of them. The church even lost its namesake cemetery in 1866. Established in 1640, it was the first municipal cemetery in Amsterdam. In other words, it was not under the control of any particular church; it was under the control of the City Hall of Amsterdam, but Mozes en Aäronkerk, as Sint-Anthoniuskerk, was allowed to keep its register of burials for this cemetery, which was primarily used to bury the less fortunate, such as paupers and strangers, just outside the Sint-Anthonispoort ["St Anthony's Gate"], only 225 yards (206 meters) southeast of the church, at the present intersection of Weesperstraat and Nieuw Herengracht.

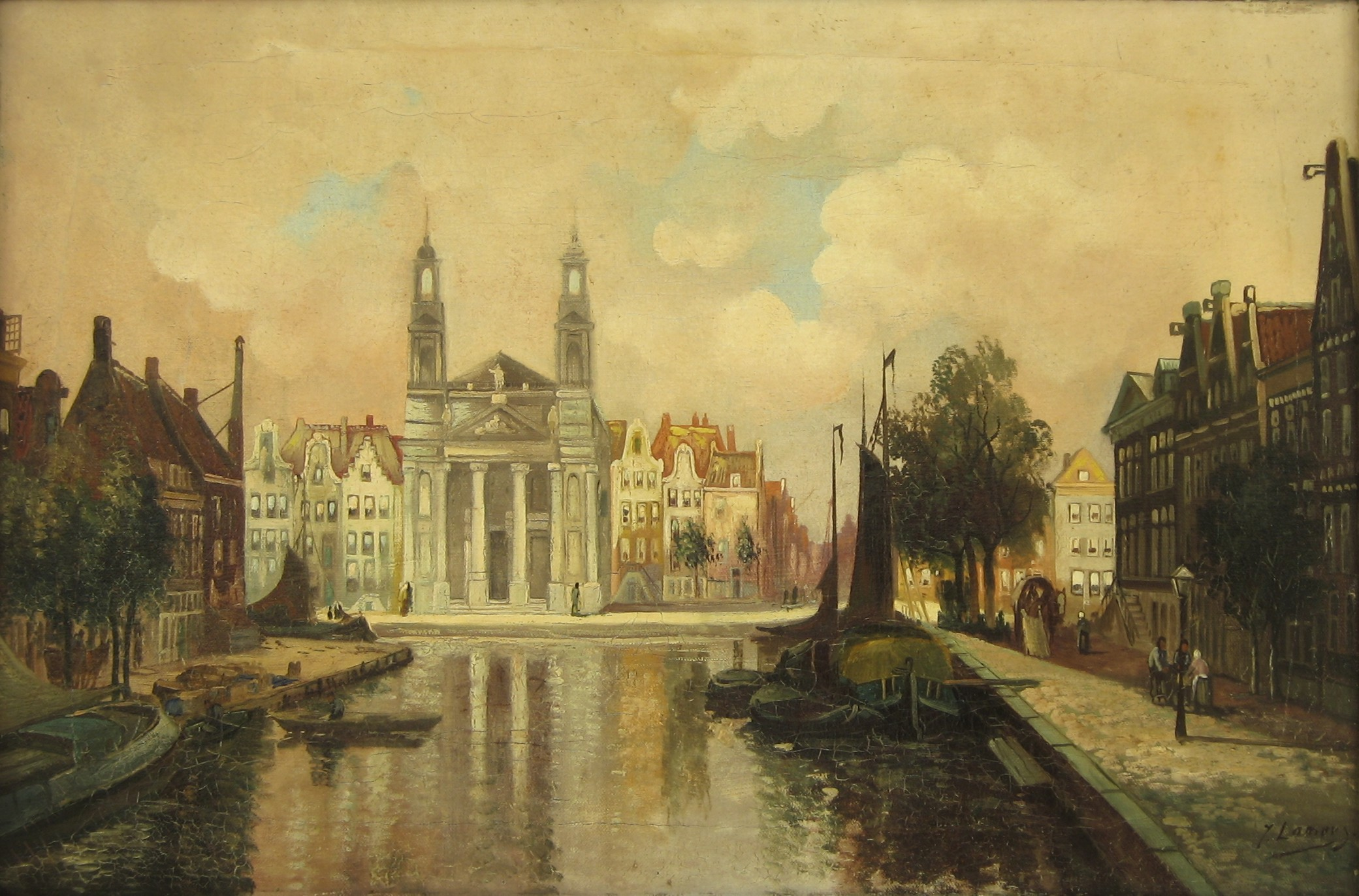
Painting by J. Lamers, 1880

During the late 19th and early 20th Century, the church was a Catholic island in a Jewish neighborhood. It served as a landmark for the Jewish ghetto throughout the German occupation of Amsterdam in World War II. Eventually, the parish of "Sint-Anthonius" was suppressed in 1969 but the church kept its official status.

In 2014, after an interruption of 34 years, the church was reconsecrated, and the weekly Sunday mass was resumed, together with weekday prayer services. The church and its liturgical function was confided to the Community of Sant'Egidio, who use it as a center for charitable activities in Amsterdam. The former activities, such as providing the setting for secular weddings, and cultural events were suspended, and the local socio-cultural organization, "Mozeshuis" ("Moses House"), opened in 1969, and previously suffering financial difficulties, was closed.

== Construction ==
The present building was built as a "Water Management Church" (Dutch: Waterstaatskerk), between 1837 and 1841 from a design by Tilman-François Suys (1783–1861) in the style of neoclassicism, with three aisles and a recessed rectangular choir. Suys also designed the Groenmarktkerk ["Green Market Street"] in Haarlem. The facade, with its twin towers, was said to be inspired by the Church of Saint-Sulpice in Paris and Santissima Trinità dei Monti in Rome.

== Artworks ==
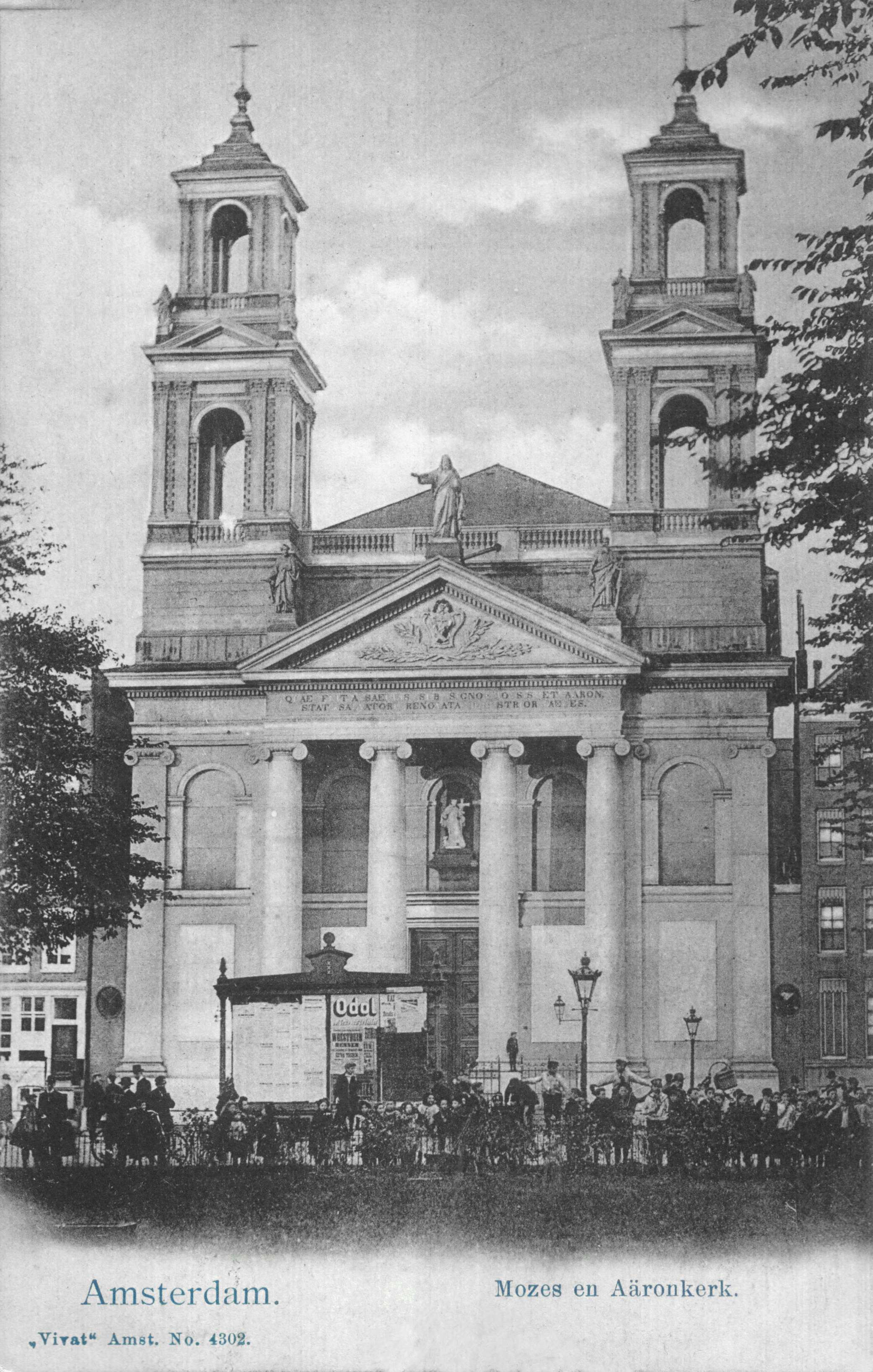
Postcard from 1902.

The statue at the top of the entrance shows the blessing of the Christ. On the postcard from 1902 (shown at left), He was flanked below, left and right are two other statues, St. Francis of Assisi and St. Anthony of Padua. More statues, St. Peter, St. Paul and the Four Evangelists, were also standing high in the two towers. They were created by the Flemish sculptor, Jan Baptist de Cuyper (1807–1852), himself a Catholic. but all the statues except the Christ were lost during World War II. The facades were made of plastered brick and iron and wooden parts of the towers were painted white. This creates a total impression of the solemn and venerable majesty of an ancient temple, done with cheap and modern materials. The columns are made of Bentheim sandstone, from the area of Bentheim in Lower Saxony of Germany.

The baroque altar, dating from about 1700, came from the original church with a painting, "De Verrijzenis van Christus [The Resurrection of Jesus]" by Jacob de Wit (1695–1754). Depending the liturgical calendar, the altarpiece would also feature either "Maria Aankondiging [Mary of the Annunciation]" or "Christus san het Kruis [Christ on the Cross]", also by Jacob de Wit. Suys designed the side altars in the same style. These were equipped with two 18th-century statues and four new statues, made by De Cuyper. On the walls are the reliefs of the fourteen Stations of the Cross, made by a Flemish sculptor, Petrus Elysens van den Bossche (1841–1921).

The church organ, designed by Charles-Marie Philbert between 1869 and 1871, was built by the organmakers from Leeuwarden, De Gebroeders Adema ["The Brothers Adema"]. Some of the pipes were supplied by the French organ builder, Cavaillé Coll. It was the first organ in the Netherlands to use the Barker lever, a French innovation that allowed faster and stronger music to be played. Expanded in 1876 and 1887, the organ was restored most recently, in 1993 and 1994, by the Dutch organ building firm from Zaandam, Flentrop. It has 48 registers on three manuals and a pedalboard. Throughout its existence, it has been played by such notables as Charles-Marie Widor and Camille Saint-Saëns.

== Chronogram ==
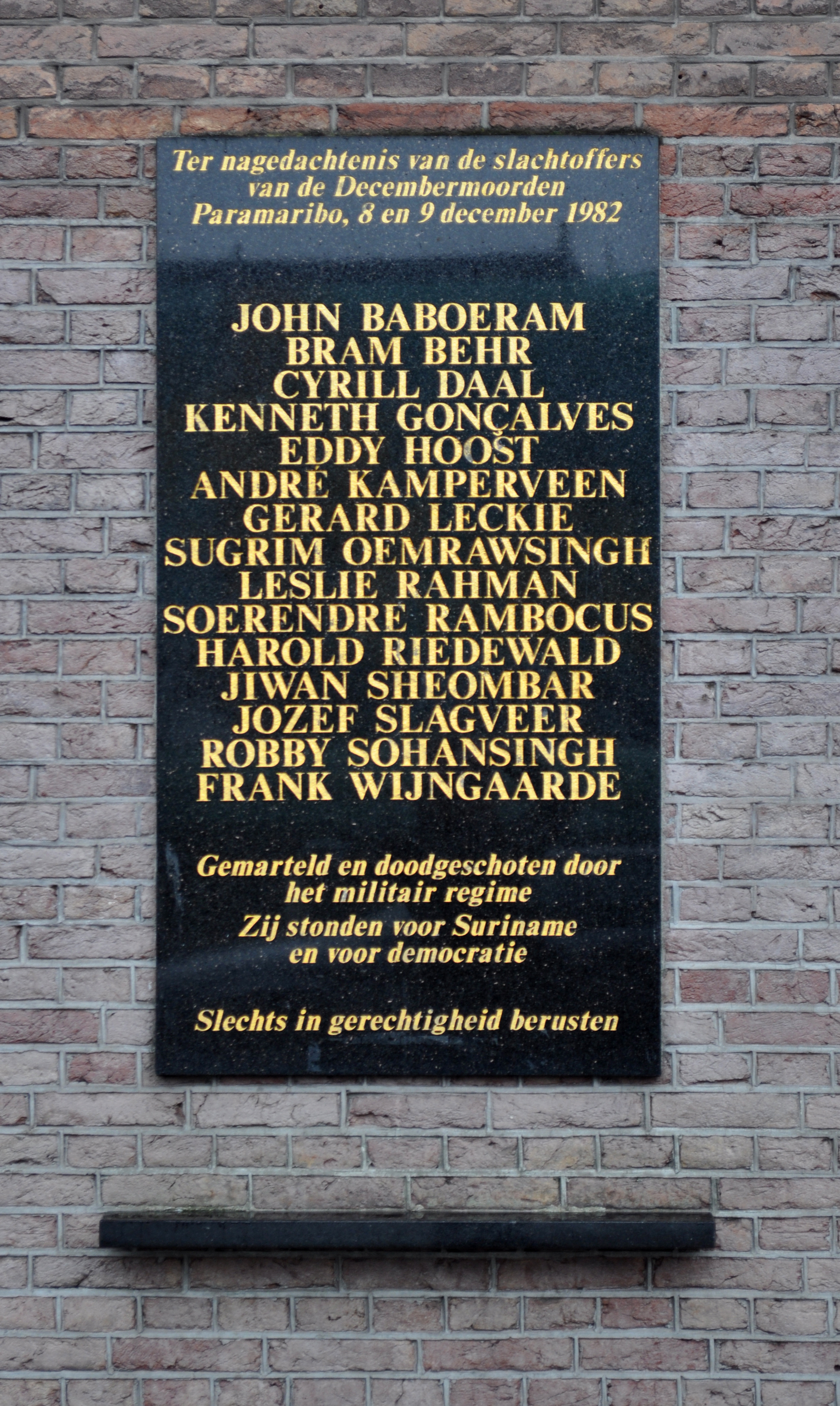
Memorial of the victims of the December Murders of 1982.

On the architrave of the portal entrance is the Latin inscription from the year 1839:

QUAE FUIT A SAECLIS SUB SIGNO MOYSIS ET AARON STAT SALVATORI RENOVATA ILLUSTRIOR AEDES.

"What was under the sign of Moses and Aaron for centuries, has been renewed for the great glory of the Savior."

The bold letters in the chronogram spell out, in the Roman numerals, with the "Y" substituting for "I I", the mathematical equation for adding up the total sum of the year 1839: 5 + 6 + 151 + 5 + 1 + 1003 + 56 + 5 + 107 + 500 = 1839

== Memorials ==
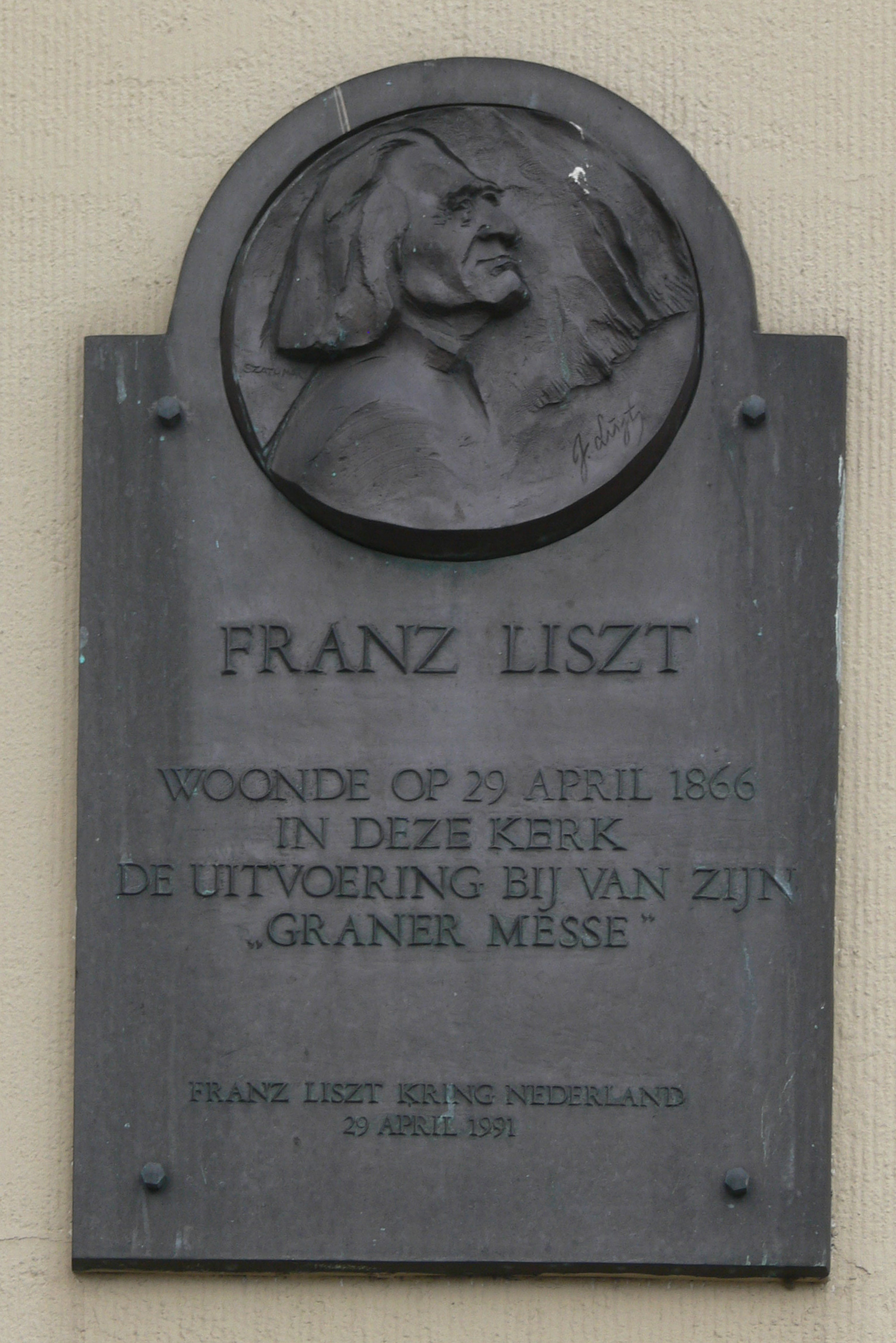
Franz Liszt Plaque

On 26 April 1866, on his visit to Amsterdam, Franz Liszt was treated at the Mozes en Aäronkerk to its orchestra and chorus's performance, led by a Dutch conductor Herman van Bree, of one of his compositions, the "Graner Mass". This occasion is commemorated by a plaque bearing his profile at the church.

On 8 December 1992, the tenth anniversary of the December murders, a plaque was placed on the side wall of the Mozes en Aäronkerk in the memory of fifteen victims who were arrested, tortured and murdered without a trial by the soldiers loyal to Dési Bouterse, then the dictator of Suriname.

== Environment ==
The painting (shown at right) features the church as it looked in 1880. The church could be reflected in the waters of the Leprozengracht ["Lepers Canal"] in the front. The canal that runs along the left side of the church was the Houtgracht ["Wood Canal"]. Both canals were filled in 1882, creating the Waterlooplein, and the open-air market was then moved from the Jodenbreestraat to the new square. On the other side of the church, the block, including the rectory, was demolished in 1968 to create a new square, Mr. Visserplein.

== Bibliography ==
- (in Dutch) Fr. Dalmatius van Heel, O.F.M., and Fr. Bonfilius Knipping, O.F.M.; Van schuilkerk tot zuilkerk. Geschiedenis van de Mozes en Aäronkerk te Amsterdam (Amsterdam: Urbi et Orbi, 1941)
- (in Dutch) Thomas von der Dunk, Een kathedraal voor Amsterdam. De voorgeschiedenis van de Mozes en Aäronkerk aan het Waterlooplein (Zutphen: Walburg Pers, 2003), ISBN 90-5730-226-8
