= Zwanenburgwal =

Coordinates: 52°22′07″N 4°53′59″E

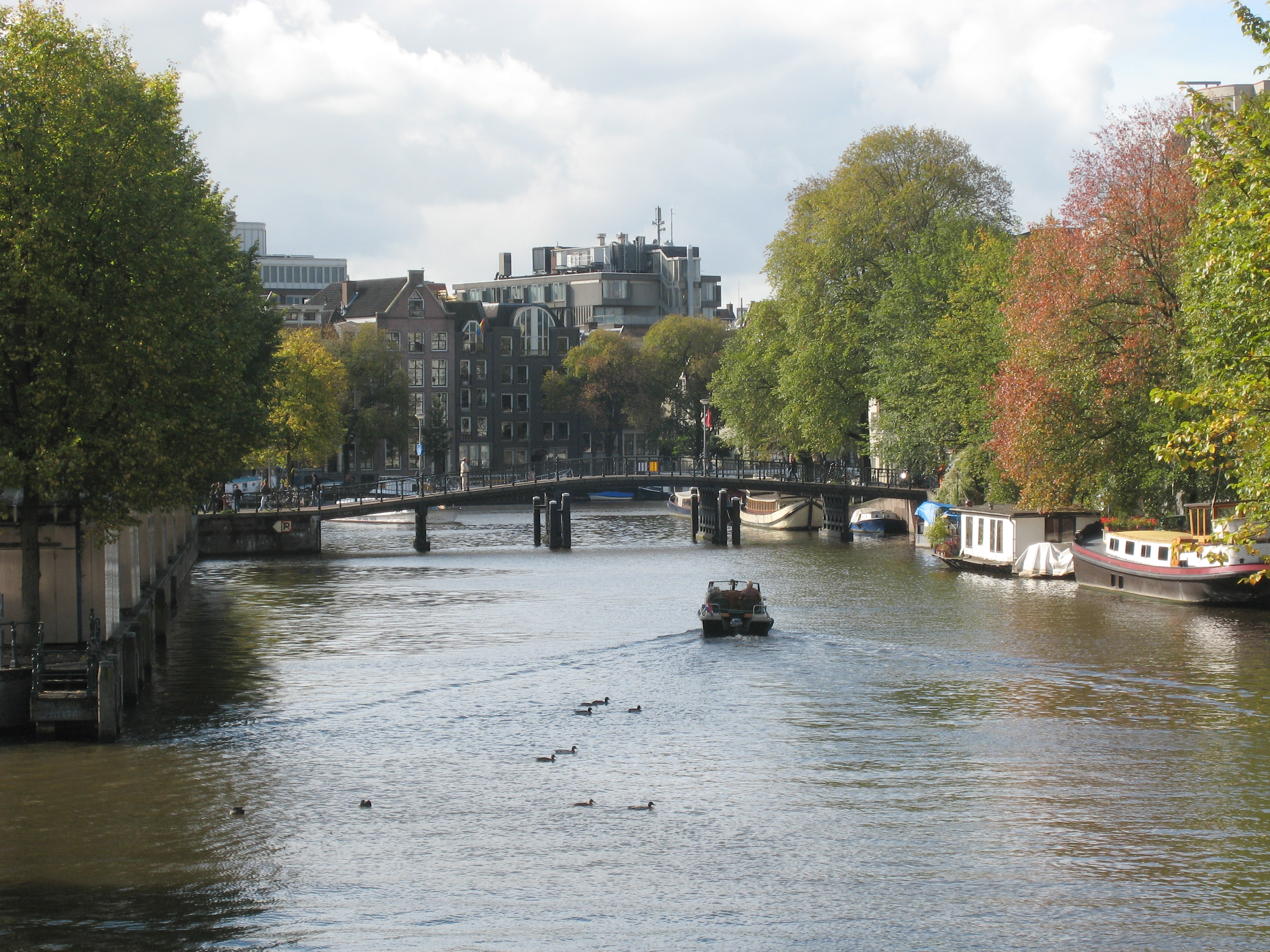
The Zwanenburgwal, looking south towards the Amstel

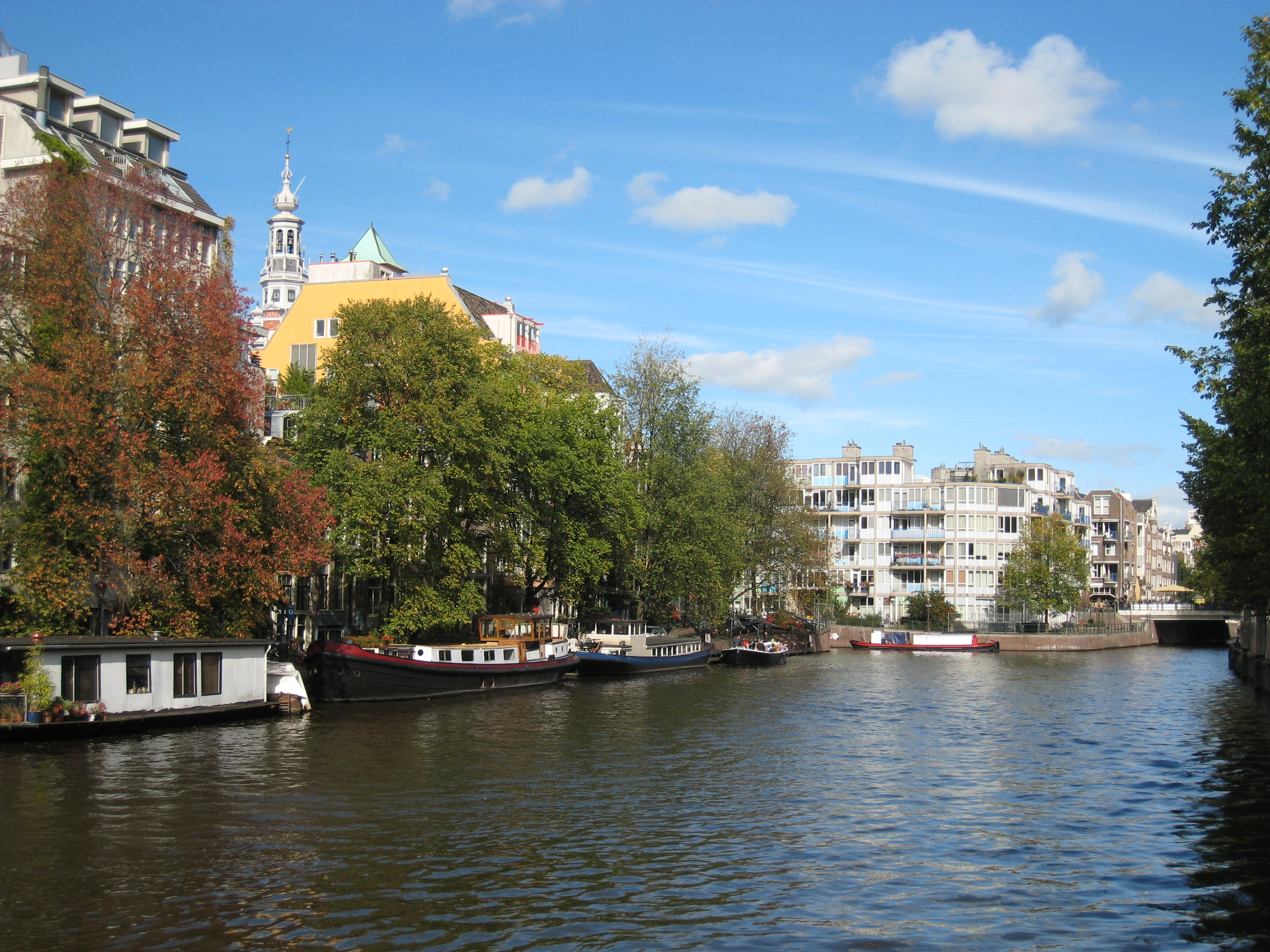
The Zwanenburgwal, looking north

The Zwanenburgwal is a canal and street in the center of Amsterdam. During the Dutch Golden Age the canal was home to painter Rembrandt van Rijn, as well as philosopher Spinoza lived here. In 2006 it was voted one of the most beautiful streets in Amsterdam by readers of Het Parool, a local daily newspaper.

The Zwanenburgwal flows from the Sint Antoniessluis sluice gate (between the streets Sint Antoniesbreestraat and Jodenbreestraat) to the Amstel river. The canal was originally named Verversgracht ("dyers' canal"), after the textile industry that once dominated this part of town. Dyed textiles were hung to dry along the canal.

Waterlooplein, a market-square popular among city visitors, sits along the Zwanenburgwal. The combined city hall and opera house structure, the Stopera, lies at the intersection of the Zwanenburgwal and the river Amstel. Also on this corner lies the Joods Verzetsmonument, a monument to the Jewish resistance during World War II, where a ceremony in remembrance of the Kristallnacht massacre is held each year.

Well-known inhabitants of the Zwanenburgwal include the following painters: Rembrandt, Karel Appel, Nicolaes Eliasz. Pickenoy, Salomon Meijer, and Cornelis van der Voort, the philosopher Baruch de Spinoza, the architect Michel de Klerk, the writer Arend Fokke Simonsz, and the communist leader Paul de Groot. From 1631 to 1635, Rembrandt lived and worked at the home of Hendrick van Uylenburgh at the corner of Zwanenburgwal and Jodenbreestraat. In 1639 he bought the adjacent house, now the Rembrandthuis museum. Rembrandt was able to leave his house via an exit onto the Zwanenburgwal, running underneath the adjacent corner house, which enabled him to move the giant canvas of the Night Watch out of his studio.

The Zwanenburgwal was originally an arm of the Amstel delta which was dug into a canal at the start of the 17th Century. In 1602 the Sint Antoniesdijk, a dike along the eastern edge of the city, was breached to construct a sluice gate, the Sint Antoniessluis. The inner section came to be known as the Zwanenburgwal and the outer section, beyond the sluice gate, became known as the Oude Schans. During construction of the canal, a part of the Amstel river was reclaimed to form two new neighborhoods, Zwanenburg (west of the Zwanenburgwal) and Vlooienburg (east of the canal).

With the arrival in Amsterdam of large numbers of Jews from all over Europe in the late 16th and early 17th Century, the Zwanenburgwal became part of the Jewish neighborhood of Amsterdam. A synagogue was located on the Zwanenburgwal until 1936. During World War II, the neighborhood was emptied of its residents as most were deported to the Nazi concentration camps. The deserted houses were used for firewood and left derelict. After the war, the Vlooienburg district was demolished to make way for a new city hall, which however was not built until the 1980s.
