= Vlooienburg =

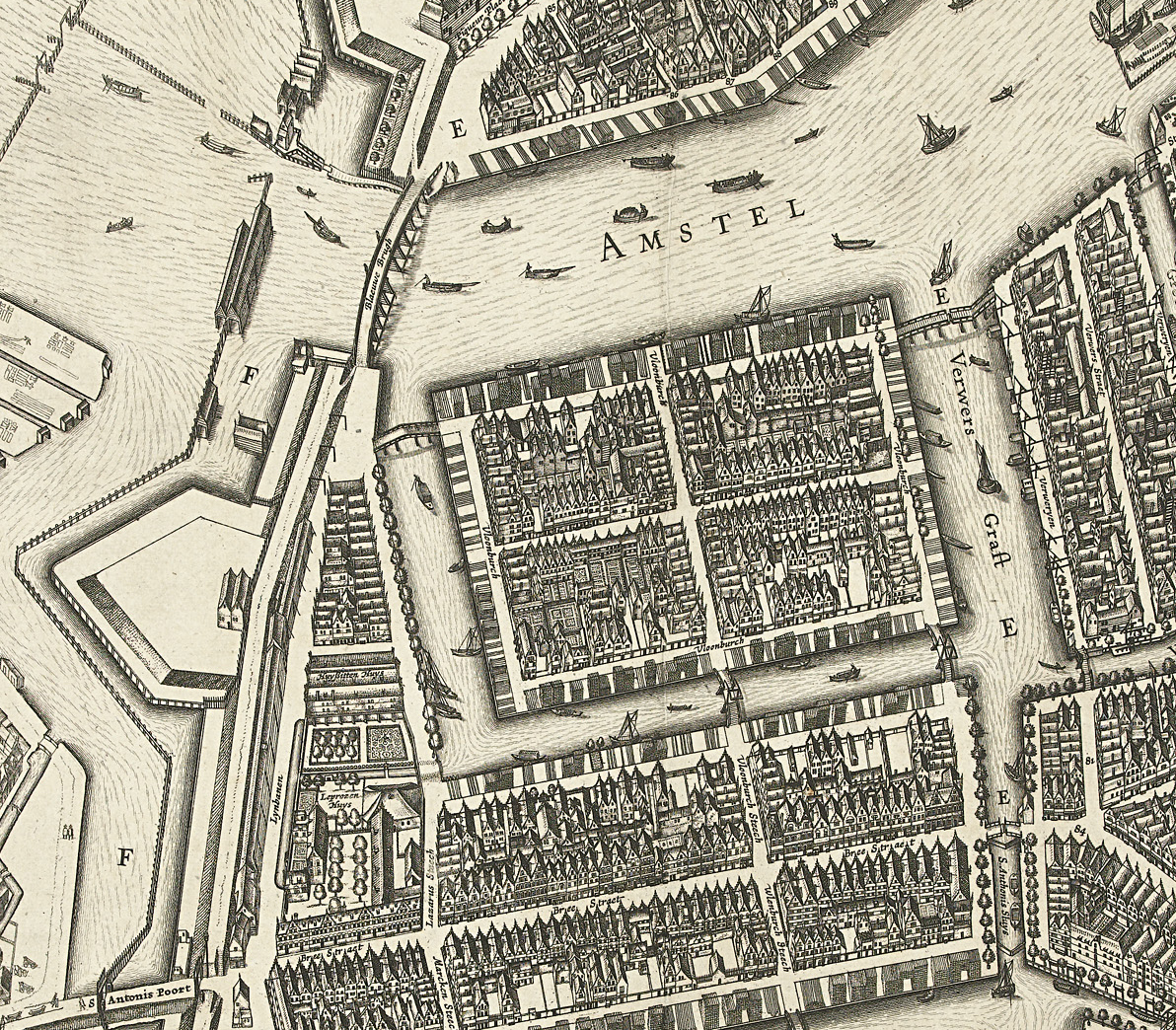
Vlooienburg on the map of Balthasar van Berckenrode (1625)

Vlooienburg or Vloonburg was a filled-in island in the Amstel river on the site of the Stopera in Amsterdam. In the seventeenth century, a lively migrant neighborhood emerged here with timber traders, Jewish merchants from the Mediterranean, kosher shopkeepers, and craftsmen, etc. The island formed the core area of Amsterdam's Jewish Quarter until the destruction in the twentieth century.

== History ==
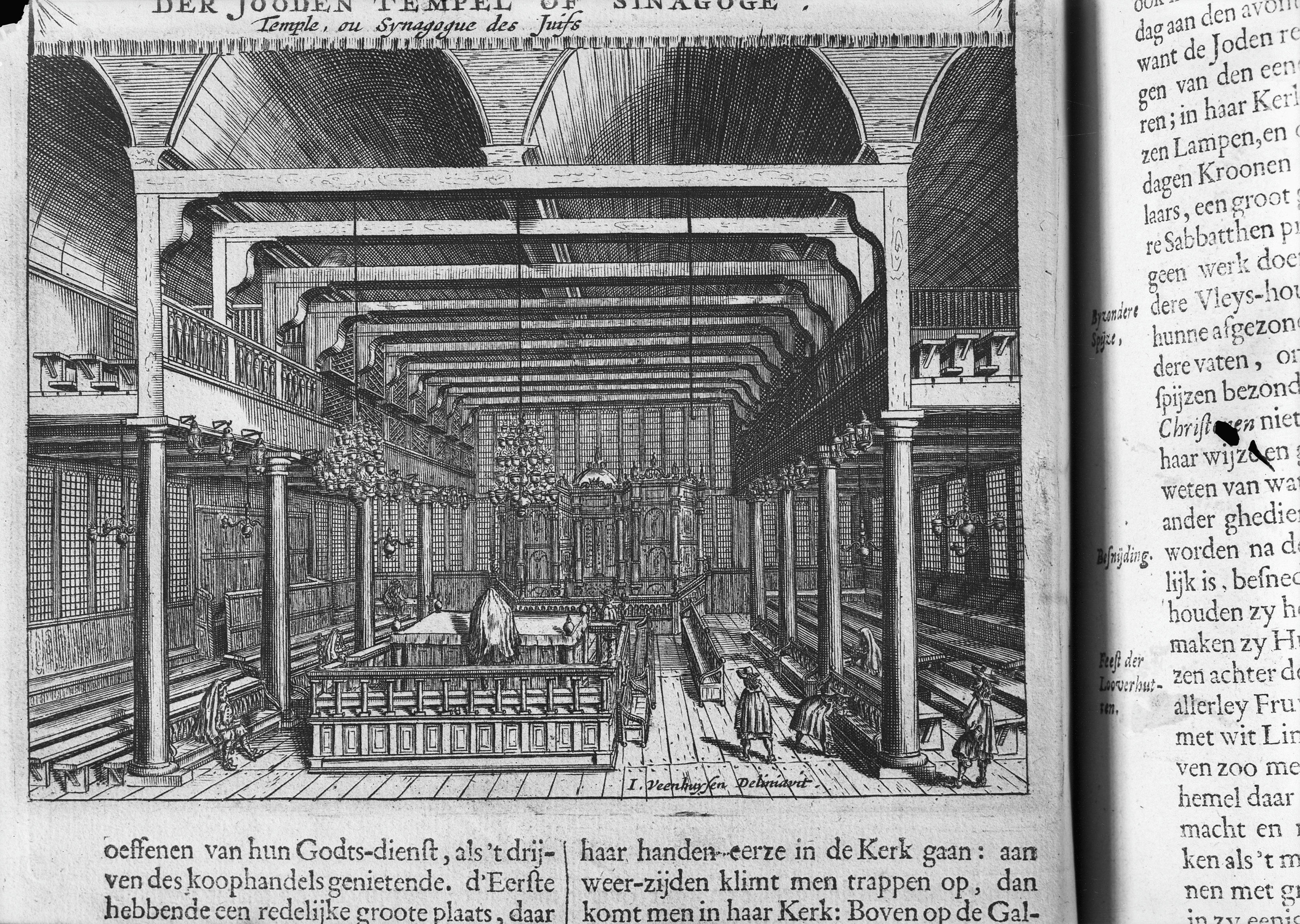
Drawing of the interior of the Talmud Torah at Houtgracht (1664), demolished in 1931

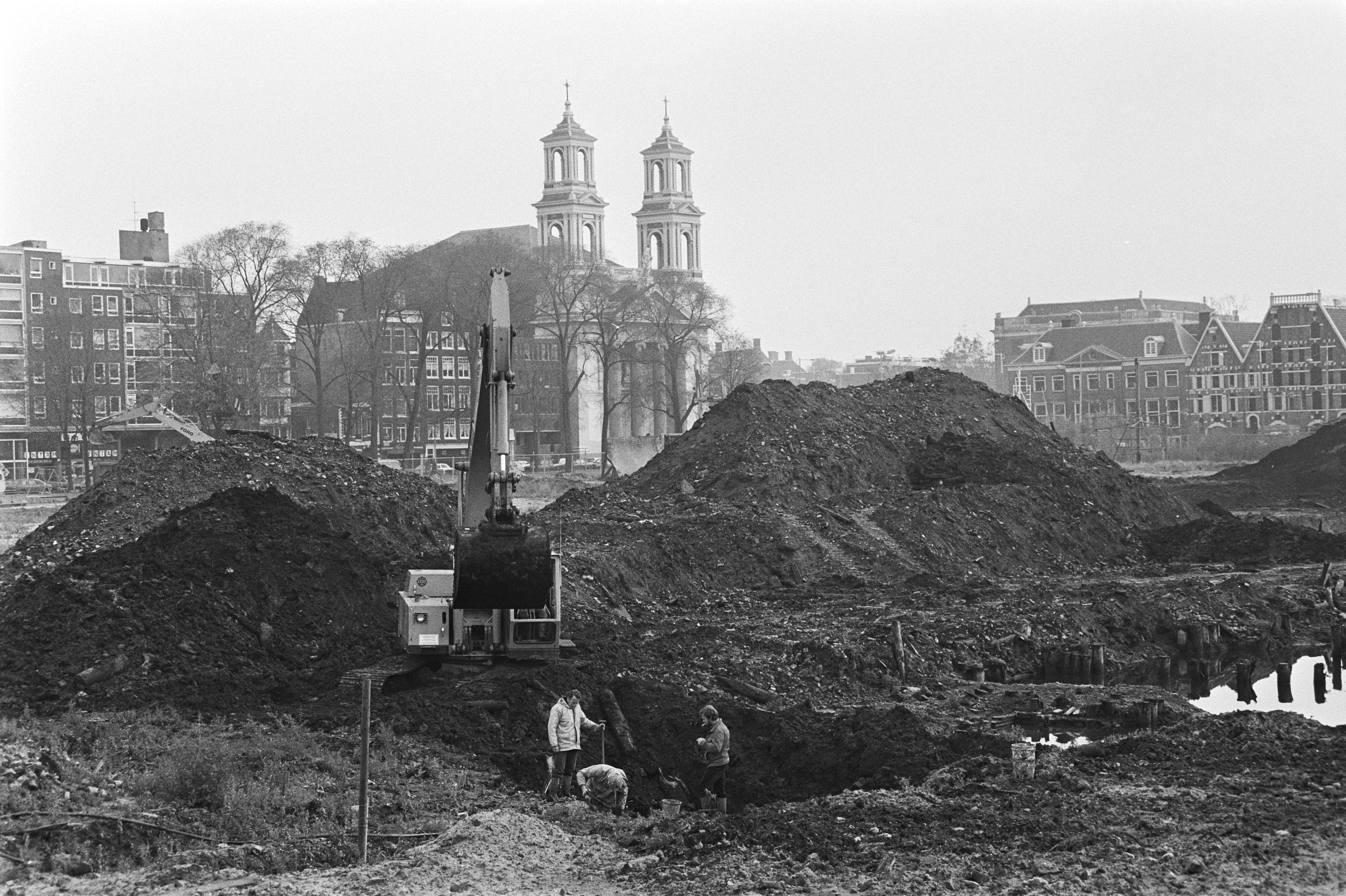
Archeologists at Waterlooplein (1981)

Not much is known about the early history of Vlooienburg, surrounded by three canals and the Amstel river. The island was expanded considerably to the south and was filled with rubble, shards, and unusable ship parts. The first sale of a house in the area dates back to June 1603. This means that the issuance of empty lots must have taken place in Winter 1602. In a short time, four blocks of houses with a total of two hundred residential buildings arose here. In 1605 timber traders arrived. The name Vlooienburg first appeared in 1609. The Brownists settled there as well. For the Jewish population the change came in 1614 through a diktat from the States of Holland. The library Ets Haim was founded in 1616. From 1618 onwards, three small synagogues and schools were established in private houses, and after a merger, the Talmud Torah at Houtgracht served until 1675.

Judah Leon Templo lived on Vlooienburg, Menasseh Ben Israel, Baruch Spinoza and family lived at Houtgracht opposite the island. Rembrandt settled for a while in a former sugar refinery but moved in 1639 to Jodenbreestraat. After a year of plague Daniel Stalpaert became the architect of orphanage along the waterfront; the timber traders disappeared. After the first wave of Sephardim immigration, many Ashkenazi from Central and Eastern Europe settled there.

For many years it was the location of a covered ballgame or tennis court, and a fish-market at the waterfront. Around 1840 Coster Diamonds was established on the island. In 1874 and 1882, the Houtgracht and Leprozengracht were filled in, meaning that Vlooienburg was no longer an island. The Waterlooplein was designed in the resulting space. The Blauwbrug dates from 1884.

After the Shoah, there was hardly anyone left to return to the homes. Vlooienburg and the adjacent islands of Uilenburg and Rapenburg are synonymous with poor houses, large families, poor hygiene and dilapidation. The badly dilapidated houses of Vlooienburg were demolished and nothing remained of the Jewish quarter. In 1982, construction of the Stopera began, the combined city hall and Opera building that stood on the site of the demolished blocks and was finished in 1986.
