= Waterlooplein =

Square in Amsterdam, Netherlands

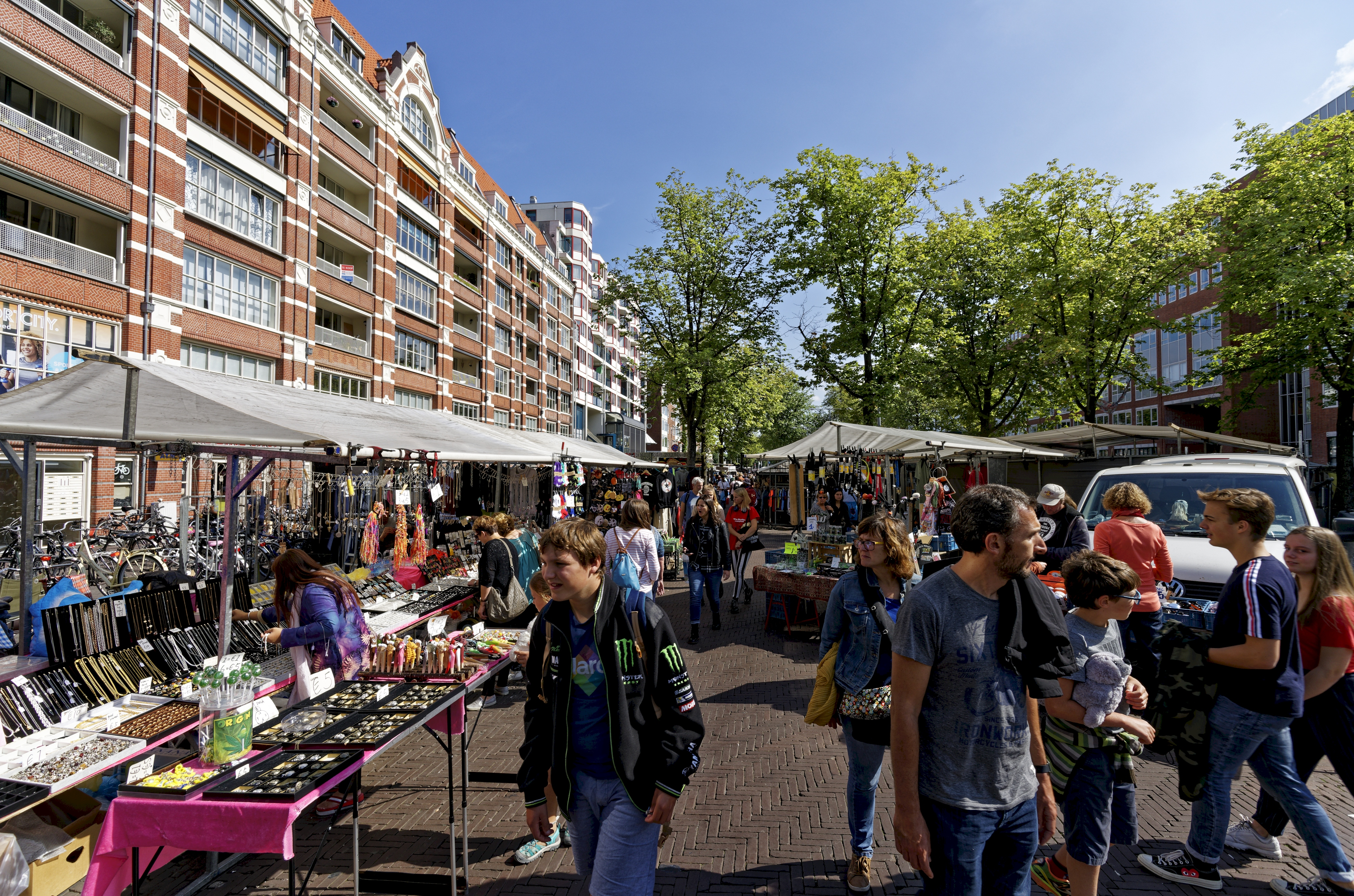
- Flea market on Waterlooplein in 2018

- Location within Amsterdam
- Namesake: Battle of Waterloo
- Type: Market square
- Location: Centrum, Amsterdam, Netherlands
- Nearest metro station: Waterlooplein
- Coordinates: 52°22′06″N 4°54′06″E

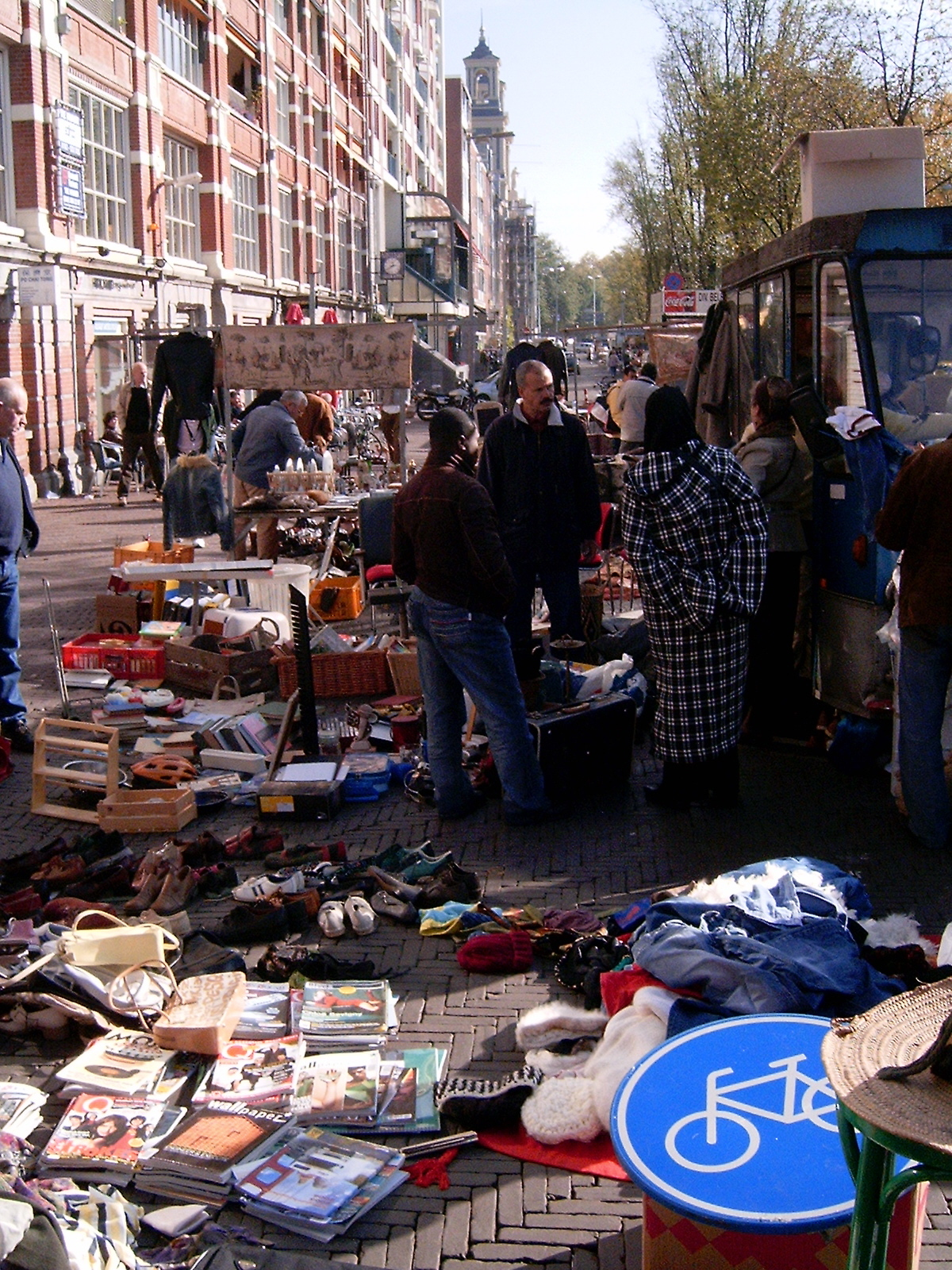
Waterlooplein flea market

Waterlooplein (Waterloo Square) is a square in the centre of Amsterdam in the Netherlands. The square near the Amstel river is named after the Battle of Waterloo in 1815. Prominent buildings on the square are the Stopera city hall and opera building and the Mozes en Aäronkerk church.

The daily flea market on the square is popular with tourists. The market has some 300 stalls and is open every day except Sunday.

Waterlooplein is a stop on the common part of Amsterdam Metro lines 51, 53, and 54. Tram line 14 and the Museumboot water taxi also stop at Waterlooplein. There is a taxi stand and parking garage.

The area of Amsterdam that includes Waterlooplein is also called Groot Waterloo district.

== History ==
Waterlooplein was created in 1882 when the Leprozengracht and Houtgracht canals were filled in. The square became a marketplace when the city government decided that the Jewish merchants in the nearby Jodenbreestraat and Sint Antoniebreestraat had to move their stalls to the square. The Waterlooplein became a daily market (except on Saturdays, the Jewish sabbath) in 1893.

During World War II the Jewish quarter was emptied of its residents as the Nazis rounded them up and sent them to concentration camps. The Waterlooplein market had disappeared by 1941. After the war, the Jewish quarter was left deserted, and the Waterlooplein market became a flea market.

In 2005, the Jewish Historical Museum presented an exhibition of paintings and photographs depicting Waterlooplein. The exhibition included works by Wolfgang Suschitzky, Max Liebermann and Oskar Kokoschka.

== Popular references ==
In 1969, Dutch performers Johnny Kraaykamp and Rijk de Gooyer had a hit single with the song "Oh Waterlooplein". This was an adaptation of Mike Wilsh's "Waterloo Road" with original lyrics by Mike Deighan and released by Jason Crest in February 1968. The Dutch lyrics, written by Herman Pieter de Boer, using the pseudonym Johnny Austerlitz, describe the flea market. A French adaptation "Les Champs-Élysées" written by Pierre Delanoë in 1969 and released by Joe Dassin received most traction.
