= Cees Dam =

Dutch architect (1932–2026)

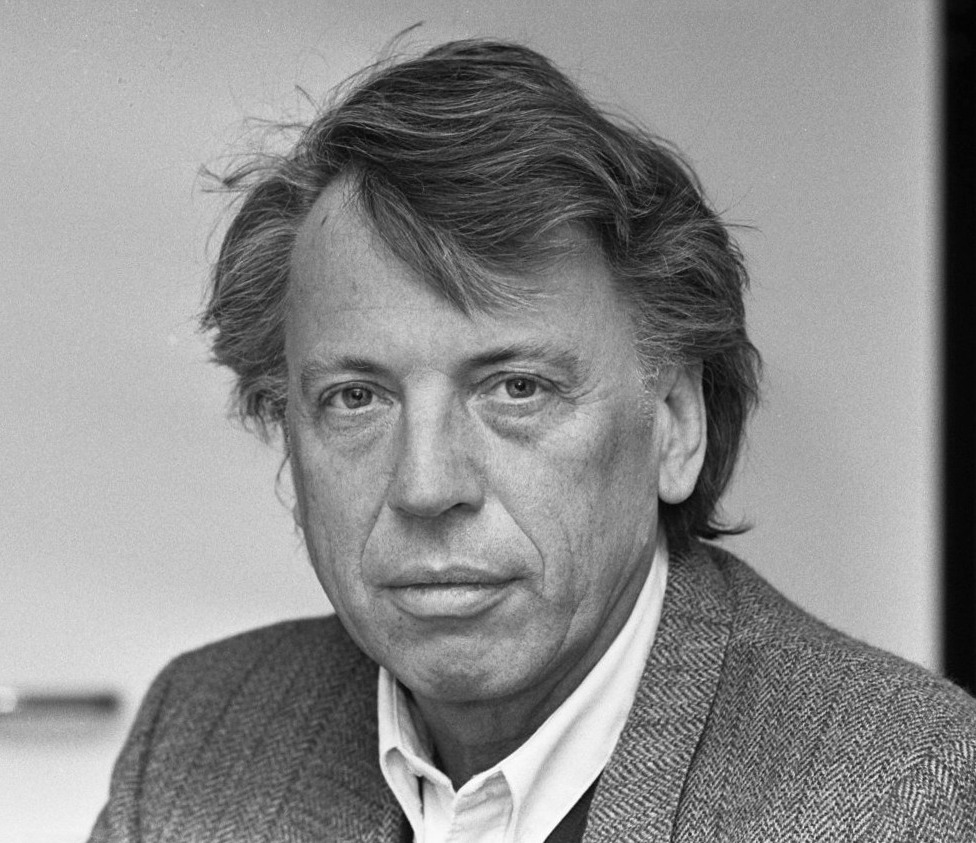
- Dam in 1987
- Born: Cornelis Gregorius Dam; 31 July 1932; Velsen, Netherlands
- Died: 13 April 2026 (aged 93)
- Education: Academy of Architecture
- Occupation: Architect

Cornelis Gregorius "Cees" Dam (31 July 1932 – 13 April 2026) was a Dutch architect.

A graduate of the Academy of Architecture, he was a partner at Dam & Partners Architecten. His notable projects include the Stopera, Coopvaert, the Maastoren, and De Zalmhaven.

Dam died on 13 April 2026, at the age of 93.
