= Academy of Architecture =

Academy of Architecture may refer to:

- Academia Mexicana de Arquitectura, Mexico
- Académie d'architecture, Paris, France
- Académie royale d'architecture, Paris, France
- Academy of Architecture (Amsterdam), Netherlands
- Accademia di Architettura di Mendrisio, Italy
- International Academy of Architecture, Sophia, Bulgaria

== See also ==
- Donbas National Academy of Civil Engineering and Architecture
- National Academy of Visual Arts and Architecture
- Russian Academy of Architecture and Construction Sciences
- Ural State Academy of Architecture and Arts
