= Rozalie Hirs =

Dutch composer and poet

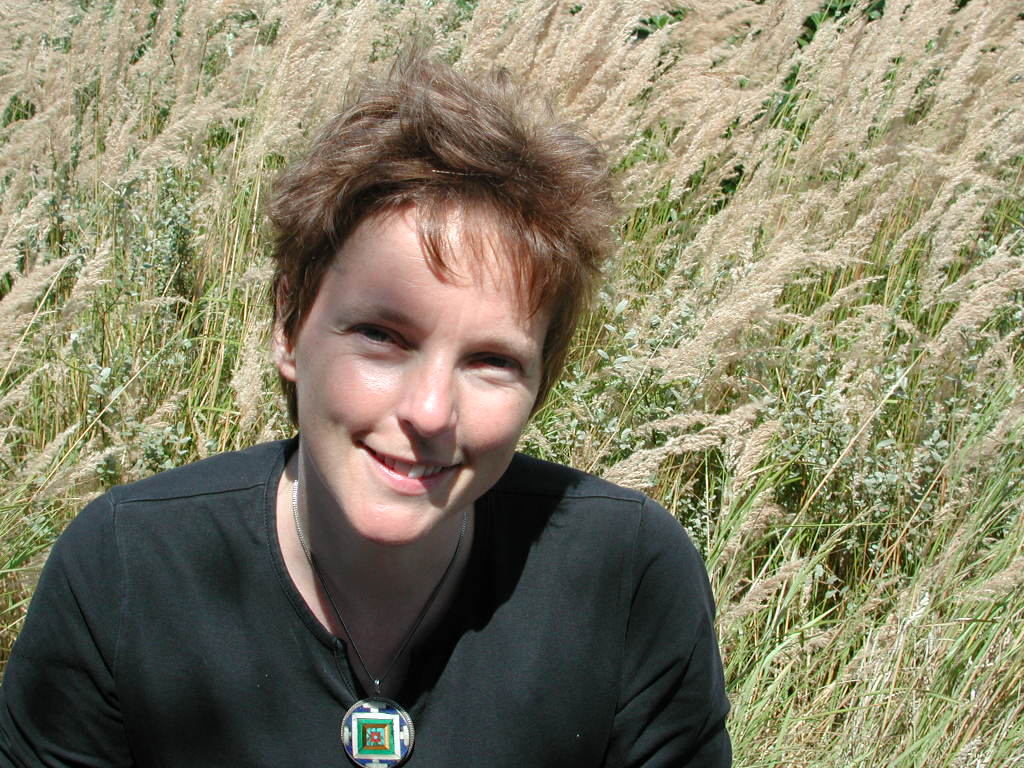

Background information
- Born: Katrien Rozalie Hirs; 7 April 1965 (age 61); Gouda, Netherlands
- Genres: Contemporary classical, experimental poetry
- Occupations: Composer, poet
- Instruments: voice, piano. Composer for: orchestra, ensemble, electroacoustic, spoken voice, vocal
- Years active: 1997–present
- Spouse: Machiel Spaan (m. 2007)
- Website: www.rozalie.com

Rozalie Hirs (born 7 April 1965) is a Dutch composer of contemporary classical music and a poet. The principal concerns of her work are the adventure of listening, reading, and the imagination.

== Biography ==
Rozalie Hirs studied piano and voice from age twelve and seventeen respectively. For her secondary education, she attended Gymnasium Herkenrath, North Rhine-Westphalia, from 1975 until 1979, and Het Nieuwe Lyceum, Bilthoven, Netherlands, from which she graduated in 1983. She subsequently studied chemical engineering at the University of Twente, Enschede, completing her Master of Science degree in 1990. During her science studies she sang leading roles in several opera productions at Muziekschool Enschede, and co-composed and performed songs with her new wave band Boolean. From 1991 to 1992 she studied classical voice with Eugenie Ditewig at Utrechts Conservatorium, from 1992 to 1994 with Gerda van Zelm at the Royal Conservatory of The Hague.

=== Music education ===
From 1991 until 1998 Hirs studied composition at the Royal Conservatory of The Hague: from 1991 until 1994 with Diderik Wagenaar, from 1994 until 1998 with Louis Andriessen, occasionally taking additional composition lessons with Gilius van Bergeijk and Clarence Barlow. She holds a Master of Music degree from the Royal Conservatory of The Hague.

From 1999 until 2002 she furthered her education in composition with the French Spectralist Tristan Murail at Columbia University New York. She obtained her Doctor of Musical Arts title from Columbia University in 2007. Her dissertation consisted of the composition Platonic ID, commissioned by Asko Ensemble, and an essay about the compositional techniques Tristan Murail developed for Le lac. In 2002 Hirs took part in the Computer music and composition course at IRCAM, taught by Mikhail Malt (OpenMusic), Benjamin Thigpen (Max/msp), Jean Lochard (Diphone), and Marco Stroppa (OMChroma).

=== Teaching ===
Hirs developed the course OpenMusic and contemporary compositional techniques which she taught in collaboration with Nieuw Ensemble during the 2005–06 academic year at Conservatorium van Amsterdam, Amsterdam School of the Arts. During the 2010–11 academic year, Hirs was Visiting lecturer at the Department of Composition at Guildhall School of Music and Drama, London. During the Autumn semester of 2017, Hirs was Visiting professor at the Department of Composition at Royal Conservatory of The Hague.

She has also taught Creative Writing courses and workshops at Kunstwelten, Akademie der Künste, Berlin, and Vormstudies, Academy of Architecture, Amsterdam School of the Arts.

== Music ==
A prolific composer, Rozalie Hirs has collaborated with Royal Concertgebouw Orchestra, Radio Filharmonisch Orkest, Ensemble Musikfabrik, Klangforum Wien, Asko/Schönberg, Quatuor Bozzini, Holland Festival, November Music, among others.

=== Musical ideas ===
Hirs's compositional techniques reveal a seemingly scientific approach, characterized by the incorporation of psychoacoustic effects, acoustic analysis of recorded sound, acoustic laws of sounding bodies, as well as mathematical functions. The listening experience itself, however, always remains central during the compositional process. Her music is essentially spectral. The music of Rozalie Hirs reveals a love for sound and refined structures, in combination with a classic approach to form characteristic of the Hague School: The uninitiated listener does not need to concern herself with the mathematical skeleton underlying Rozalie Hirs's music. The composer reveals the soft gleaming skin of sounds in her music and poetry.

In In LA she uses the psychoacoustic Cocktail party effect (discovered by Colin Cherry in the fifties) as a metaphor of how we remember. In Book of Mirrors and Roseherte she investigates the use of the psychoacoustic effect of hearing combination tones when we are exposed to pitch intervals. The acoustic laws of sounding strings are investigated in article 4 through harmonics and their placements on the string. In Platonic ID Hirs used the ratios mentioned by Plato in the Timaeus (1:2:4:8 and 1:3:9:27) in order to generate her basic harmonic material.

=== Microtones ===
The present music notational system is based on twelve-tone equal temperament, corresponding to semitones, meaning that not all frequencies and pitches may be captured. Expanding the present system to a 24-tone or even 48-tone tempered tuning, corresponding to a resolution of a quarter tone and an eighthtone respectively, will lead to a larger choice of pitches, yet still entails approximation of frequencies into a notational grid (quantification).

Hirs composes her music in a continuum of frequencies. She thus uses the calculated frequencies and other musical parameters to generate electronic sounds as well as the instrumental score performed live. When notating the scores of Book of Mirrors and Roseherte Hirs started out approximating the frequencies to the nearest halftone. During the creative process of composing Roseherte Hirs decided to approximate into quarter tones. Since then many of her compositions have been notated either in quarter tones, or in semitones with cents deviations indicated above the note.

The electronic sounds in Hirs's compositions are synthesized using the unapproximated frequencies and provide a means of reference for the musician during rehearsal and performance. In this way the role of the electronic sounds is two-fold, both as constituent to the music as well as a reference base for the performer: the electronic sounds shape the overall music and inform the instrumentalist how to adjust the intonation of the written pitches.

== Musical works ==
=== Orchestral ===
- Book of mirrors, for chamber orchestra (film: Joost Rekveld; 2001)
- Platonic ID, for chamber orchestra (2005–06)
- Roseherte, for symphony orchestra, electronic sounds (2007–08; version for 42 players, electronic sounds, 2014)
- Ain, silabar ain, for jazz orchestra (2013)
- Lichtende Drift, for string orchestra, 23 parts divisi (2014)
- Atlantis ampersand, for chamber orchestra, choir, electronic sounds (2015)
- The honeycomb conjecture, for large ensemble, electronic sounds (2015)
- lightclouds, for large ensemble, electronic sounds (2019)
- avatar, for orchestra (2022)
- bron, for symphony orchestra (2023)

=== Ensemble ===
- Sacro Monte, for ensemble (1997)
- a-book-of-light, for ensemble, electronic sounds (2003)
- Little whale and the ice, for ensemble (2010)
- Venus [evening star] [invisible] [morning star], for percussion sextet, electronic sounds (2010)
- Zenit [north] [east] [south] [west], for string quartet (2010)
- Arbre généalogique, for soprano, ensemble, electronic sounds (poem, music: Rozalie Hirs; 2011)
- Nadir, for string quartet, electronic sounds (2014)
- parallel world [breathing], for ensemble, electronic sounds (2017)
- parallel sea [to the lighthouse], for ensemble, electronic sounds (2018)
- dreams of airs, for voice, ensemble, electronic sounds (poem, music: Rozalie Hirs; 2017–18)
- hand in hand, for soprano, string quartet (poem, music: Rozalie Hirs; 2020)
- artemis, for soprano, ensemble, electronic sounds (poem, music: Rozalie Hirs; 2022) commissioned by Donaueschingen Festival
- adonis blue, for string quartet (2023; version for saxophone quartet, 2024)
- charms, symmetries, for ensemble (2024)

=== Chamber ===
- article 0 [transarctic buddha], for percussion solo (2000)
- article 1 to 3 [the] [aleph] [a], for piano solo (2003)
- article 4 [map butterfly], for violin solo (or viola solo) (2004)
- article 5 [dolphin, curved time], for soprano solo (poem, music: Rozalie Hirs; 2008)
- article 7 [ways to climb a mountain], for bass clarinet, electronic sounds (2012)
- article 6 [waves], for electric guitar, electronic sounds (2013)
- article 8 [infinity], for flute, electronic sounds (2014)
- Infinity Stairs, for flute, electric guitar, bass clarinet, electronic sounds (2014)
- On Tenderness, for piano & electronic sounds (2017)
- meditations, for piano & electronic sounds (2017)
- article 10 [prismes], for violoncello solo (2021) commissioned by Radio France
- bee sage, for violoncello, contrabass clarinet (2023)
- codex lilium, for string trio (2025)

=== Music with spoken voice ===
- Slaaplied voor een duivel, for narrator & music box (poem, music: Rozalie Hirs; 1994)
- In LA, for six spoken voices or spoken voice & soundtrack (poem, music: Rozalie Hirs; 2003)
- A throwaway coincidence that determined everything, for spoken voice & soundtrack (poem, music: Rozalie Hirs; film: Paul Leyton; 2004)
- Klangtext, Textklang, for spoken voice & live electronics (poem: Rozalie Hirs; music: Rozalie Hirs, James Fei; 2004)
- Van het wonder is word, for spoken voice & soundtrack (poem, music: Rozalie Hirs; 2005)
- Aan de zon, de wereld, for spoken voice & soundtrack (poem, music: Rozalie Hirs; 2006)
- Pulsars, movement IV, for spoken voice & soundtrack (poem, music: Rozalie Hirs; 2006–07)
- Vlinders, gras, for spoken voice quartet (poem, music: Rozalie Hirs; 2007)
- Poetry pieces I-III [heaven bleak] [dolphin] [family tree], for spoken voice & soundtrack (poem, music: Rozalie Hirs; 2008)
- Curved space, for spoken voice, ensemble & live electronics (poem, music: Rozalie Hirs; 2009)
- Bridge of Babel, for spoken voice & soundtrack (poem, music: Rozalie Hirs; 2009)
- Curvices, ten compositions and an interlude for sound app (poem, music: Rozalie Hirs; programming: Yvan Vander Sanden; design, animation: Cox & Grusenmeyer; 2013)
- In state of [war], for twelve voices (poem, music: Rozalie Hirs; 2013)
- Tijd en sintel, for spoken voice, 31-tone organ & soundtrack (poem, music: Rozalie Hirs; 2016)
- dreams of airs, for voice, ensemble & soundtrack (poem, music: Rozalie Hirs; 2017–18)
- all that green and blue, for voice & soundtrack (poem, music: Rozalie Hirs; 2022)

=== Electronic or electroacoustic music (without live performers) ===
- For Morton Feldman, electroacoustic (2000)
- Geluksbrenger, electronic music for website (music: Rozalie Hirs; design, programming: Harm van den Dorpel; 2008)
- Pulsars, movements I-III, V, electroacoustic (2007)
- Interlude for Curvices, electroacoustic (2013)
- Hilbert's Hotel, 31-tone MIDI controlled player organ, electronic sounds (2015)
- Luisterhuis, electroacoustic composition for architectural installation/sculpture (music: Rozalie Hirs; spatial design: Machiel Spaan, M3H architecten; 2017)
- Ways of Space, quadrophonic electronic music composition for sound sculpture (music: Rozalie Hirs; spatial design: Machiel Spaan, M3H architecten; 2019)

== Poetry ==
Playing with sound in multiple layers of meaning and with multiple possibilities for reading leads to a ‘fluid’ poetry. Among these layers, the reader may choose again and again, thus to a large extent shaping his own reading experience. A multiplicity of reading possibilities and identities has become Hirs’ poetical trademark, forming a bridge to her music. In 2010, her CD "Pulsars" was released. On this CD, Hirs investigates polyglot language and the simultaneity of streams of meaning in three electroacoustic works using original texts in English.

=== Beginnings ===
On 10 May 1991 Rozalie Hirs presented her poetry for the first time to the public at the student festival for culture De Pythische Spelen, Enschede. She received the third prize for poetry and an invitation by Jan Kuijper, the renowned Amsterdam-based Querido's principal poetry editor at the time. In 1992 Hirs's poetry debut was published by the literary magazine De Revisor. In 1995 she was awarded the first prize for poetry at De Pythische Spelen, Amsterdam. Querido published her first poetry book Locus in 1998, followed by Logos (2002), and Speling (Leeway, 2005). Hirs' work was selected for De 100 beste gedichten van 1998, 2002, 2005, and appeared in poetry collections, and literary magazines in The Netherlands (De Revisor, Tirade, De Gids, De Tweede Ronde, Lust en Gratie), Belgium (Poëziekrant, De Standaard), and Germany (Akzente, Carl Hanser Verlag; Sprachbuch, Ernst Klett Sprachen; Bohrmachine, Akademie der Künste, Berlin), and the United States.

==== Locus (1998) ====
"In her first poetry book Locus Rozalie Hirs plays with masks. Her poems are monologues of personages stemming from Greek mythology, philosophy, and the Judeo-Christian tradition." In addition we find references to films, plays, and poems: for example, the poem Man Bites Dog refers to the Belgian mockumentary Man Bites Dog (C’est arrivé près de chez vous) from 1992, while the poem Lucifer refers to the eponymous play by Joost van den Vondel from 1654 (and John Milton's later Paradise Lost). "The poet brings her archetypical personalities to life within the critical and formative circumstances, recalling the myth and presenting a new version of the tale. Almost without exception these poems deal with the ambiguity of situations we see ourselves confronted with in the world."

==== Logos (2002) ====
"Logos, Rozalie Hirs’ second collection of poems, has the reader traveling through the human body. Inside the book there is an anatomical drawing, made by artist Noëlle von Eugen, by which the reader can navigate through the collection. The logos of the title might refer to the laws of the body, with which we find ourselves confronted through the world." Hirs included an anatomical map within the collection, by which the reader might navigate through the book as if it were a body. Visual artist Noëlle von Eugen created this map. Along with the body parts, she listed abbreviations for the titles of all the poems in which that body part appears. Since the anatomical map in fact functions as a hyperstructure of the collection, Logos online came about.

==== Speling (2005) ====
"How poetry imposes its own rules, is demonstrated unequivocally by the third collection of Rozalie Hirs (1965): [Speling]." "The showpiece of the collection then is the ten-page long [In LA], which can be read as a meditation on music and memory, and in which the words find themselves interspersed with a large amount of white space. The stuttering of the speaker gives the words weight and renders the meditations forceful. ‘LA’ is short for Louis Andriessen, whose utterances Hirs has collected and vocalized. It is a sober tribute to Andriessen's beautiful, heavy words, and the chosen form lends this thinking-out-loud a buzzing hesitance that every speaker experiences when trying to find language for grand things."

=== Counterpoint and fluidity ===
With her following books Geluksbrenger (Lucky Charm, 2008), gestamelde werken (work in stuttering, 2012), verdere bijzonderheden (further particulars, 2017), oneindige zin (infinite sense, 2021), ecologica (2023), and dagtekening van liefdesvormen (2024), Hirs playfully develops her mature writing style, based on simultaneous multiplicities of meaning, possibilities of reading. In 2017 the Berlin-based Kookbooks published her multilingual compendium gestammelte werke, containing original poems in Dutch, German, English and Spanish by the poet, and translations into more than ten languages by Daniela Seel, Henri Deluy, Diego Puls, Kim Andringa, Jelica Novakovic, Donald Gardner, Daniel Cunin, among others. In 2014 her poetry collection in Serbian translation život mogućnosti appeared with Biblioteka Prevodi in Banja Luka, Bosnia & Herzegovina. In 2019 her poetry collection in Spanish translation ahora es una rosa was published by Yauguru, Uruguay. In 2021 her poetry collection in Danish translation spor af lykkebringer was published by Melodika forlaget, Copenhagen. Hirs' work was selected for De 100 beste gedichten van 2008, and 2012, and appeared in poetry collections, and literary magazines in Belgium, Germany, France, Mexico, and the Netherlands.

==== Geluksbrenger (2008) ====
"The musical poetry of Geluksbrenger is constructed along the line of a ‘counterpoint’. Within a poem, Hirs seems to be stacking different poems on top of each other, processing them, splicing them, mixing them, shaking them, letting them flow into one another."

==== gestamelde werken (2012) ====
"Hirs likes to go all the way, and thereby reaches for the highest points. She is a composer as well. Her best poems ‘sing’ and have a forceful melody." "As a poet, Rozalie Hirs is an impressionist who likes to show how her working process has unfolded. She writes sensitive verses that idiosyncratically try to bring about a connection between romanticism and mathematics." "Watch, just as you are seen. Name, just as you are named. Create, just as you are created. And read like a creator: stammering."

==== verdere bijzonderheden (2017) ====
"Quietly, Hirs is working on a remarkable body of work. In it, the entire cosmos is heard, and it's the question if we're dealing with a single cosmos, or several at once." "Rozalie Hirs celebrates life in this collection: sensually, singing." "Immediately, a distinct voice starts to sound, a modest, yet clear voice, that takes advantage of the musicality as well as the semantics of language."

==== oneindige zin (2021) ====
"This poetry is sensual, has an appetite for enjoyment and is looking for meaning, but can also be read as one unending sentence without punctuation." "Rozalie Hirs's infinite sense is connected to infinite being, which keeps on flowing after our death. Hirs captures bits of this stream in her poetry and renders the heartbeat of language audible and palpable, constantly appealing to the reader to co-create an imaginary world in which poet and reader fleetingly coincide in language." "Departing from this moment of receptivity, Hirs embarks on a surprising and overwhelming exploration of language, time, space, humanity, nature, perception, memory." "Once more, in this collection Hirs proves that she can create a play of poetic language like nobody else."

==== ecologica (2023) ====
"ecologica is her most daring and possibly most personal collection to date, in the sense that the poet's voice sounds more pervasively forceful than ever. Hirs has managed to fashion a very urgent contemporary problem, climate change, into a lyrical stream of words. Doing so, she connects the magic of poetry to the biting irony of protest." "That way the words of Hirs, who is also active as a composer, are like music: the chords flow into one another rhythmically, quite oblivious of the boundaries of a sentence." "The reader of this collection will be poised between despair and being profoundly moved."

==== dagtekening van liefdesvormen (2024) ====
"Every collection by Rozalie Hirs is once again a new compendium of stunning sound-art in every sense of the word." "This musicality is, of course, connected to her background as a composer, but it is equally shaped by her exuberant handling of language and the way she, as it were, plays the words themselves." "The language flows and is full of shifts in sound. Hirs also dares to abandon conventional syntax. Sentences and clauses can often be connected in multiple ways, which naturally makes you read slowly and attentively. It’s a tried-and-true method in her oeuvre by now, but it need not obstruct understanding—if that is even the point." "More than an autobiography, this is a book of love poems—a collection in which love takes place. Just as in ecologica, Rozalie Hirs practices in dagtekening van liefdesvormen a kind of romanticism that never lays claim to what it sings of—not the other, and not the singing self. A romanticism that is free and frees, surrendering itself to ‘that dumb luck of becoming.’"

=== Digital Poetry and installations ===
In collaborating with visual artists and graphic designers Hirs creates digital poetry, and museum installations, including Logos online (Dutch, 2003), Family Tree app (Dutch, English, Chinese, Swedish; 2006), Lucky charm online (multilingual, 2011), Sightbook (English, 2012), Curvices app (English, 2013), oneindige zin digitaal (Dutch, 2023), and the case for a small language network (Dutch, 2024).

Lucky charm online was released with poems, recordings and music (listening spaces, spoken word, and musical pieces with text) by Rozalie Hirs, and interactive poetry applications developed by Harm van den Dorpel. The interactive applications make the experience of reading, normally restricted to the page and the head of the reader, tangible and visible. As reader, one makes choices over and over again while reading, thereby actually recreating the text as one reads, usually more than one realizes. Interactive applications and digital poetry can provide an insight into these interventions into, and recreations of, the text, and show something of the reading experience, or even the writing experience of the poet.

== Discography ==
=== Portrait albums ===
- R. Hirs: Sacro Monte (CD single; instrumental work; performers: Ives Ensemble), Present, NM Classics, Donemus, Amsterdam (1999)
- R. Hirs: In LA (CD single; electroacoustic work, based on own spoken text; performer: Rozalie Hirs), Drukkerij Tielen, Boxtel (2003)
- R. Hirs: Platonic ID (portrait CD; instrumental works; performers: Asko/Schönberg, Stefan Asbury, Arnold Marinissen, Anna McMichael, Dante Boon, Bas Wiegers), Attacca Productions, Amsterdam (2007)
- R. Hirs: Pulsars (portrait CD; electroacoustic works, based on own spoken text; performers: Rozalie Hirs, Arnold Marinissen), Attacca Productions/Muziek Centrum Nederland, Amsterdam (2010)
- R. Hirs: Infinity Stairs (portrait CD; solo works and chamber music; performers: Marieke Franssen, Wiek Hijmans, Keren Motseri, Fie Schouten, Marie Ythier), Iris or Hazel, Amsterdam (2025)
- R. Hirs: Rosehart (portrait CD; orchestral works; performers: Susan Narucki, Elena Schwarz, Micha Hamel, Ducan Ward, Pierre-André Valade, Radio Filharmonisch Orkest, South Netherlands Orchestra, Asko/Schönberg), Iris or Hazel, Amsterdam (2025)

=== Anthologies ===
- R. Hirs: bee sage (2024), instrumental work, part of the anthology Bee sage (performers: Fie Schouten, Katharina Gross), Attacca Productions, Amsterdam, 2024
- R. Hirs: article 6 [waves] (2013), instrumental work with electronic sounds, part of the anthology Electric Language (performer: Wiek Hijmans), Attacca Productions, Amsterdam: 2018
- R. Hirs: venus (2010), instrumental work, part of the anthology Six (performers: Slagwerk Den Haag), Attacca Records, Amsterdam, 2015
- R. Hirs: article 7 (2012), instrumental work with electronic sounds, part of the anthology Ladder of Escape 11 (performer: Fie Schouten), ATT2014140, Attacca Productions, Amsterdam (2014)
- R. Hirs: pulsars (selection) (2007), electroacoustic work, based on own spoken text, part of the anthology Anthology of Dutch Electronic Music 1999-2000 (performer: Rozalie Hirs), Basta Music|MCN, Amsterdam, 2011
- R. Hirs: source of blue (2005), instrumental work, part of the anthology Red, White & Blues (performer: Marcel Worms), Attacca Productions, Amsterdam, 2010
- R. Hirs: article 0 [transarctic buddha] (2000), instrumental work, part of the anthology Traces, Spuren (performer: Johannes Fischer), Genuin|Deutschlandradio, Leipzig, 2009
- R. Hirs: article 0 [transarctic buddha] (2000), instrumental work, part of the anthology Works for Percussion (performer: Arnold Marinissen), Amsterdam, 2002
- R. Hirs: schizofonia (1994), electroacoustic work, part of the anthology Soundscape Amsterdam, Staalplaat, Amsterdam, 1995
- R. Hirs: slaaplied voor een duivel (1994), instrumental work, based on own spoken text, part of the anthology Music Box. 32 composities voor speeldoos (performers: Ron Ford, Thom Hoffman), VPRO Eigen Wijs, Hilversum, 1994

== Bibliography ==
=== Composition and research ===
- R. Hirs, "On Murail's Le lac", D.M.A. dissertation, Columbia University/New York, Ann Arbor: ProQuest, 2007.
- R. Hirs, B. Gilmore, eds., Contemporary Compositional Techniques and OpenMusic, Collection Musique/Sciences, Paris: Editions Delatour/IRCAM, 2009. ISBN 978-275-210-080-1
- R. Hirs, "On Tristan Murail's Le lac", Contemporary Compositional Techniques and OpenMusic, Collection Musique/Sciences, Paris: Editions Delatour/IRCAM, 2009. pp 45–89. ISBN 978-275-210-080-1
- R. Hirs, "Frequency-based compositional techniques in the music of Tristan Murail", Contemporary Compositional Techniques and OpenMusic, Collection Musique/Sciences, Paris: Editions Delatour/IRCAM, 2009. pp 93–196. ISBN 978-275-210-080-1
- R. Hirs, "Zeitgenössische Kompositionstechniken und OpenMusic: Murail's Le Lac", Klangperspektiven (edited by Lukas Haselböck), Wolke Verlag, Hofheim, 2011. pp 119–164. ISBN 978-393-600-081-8
- R. Hirs, ‘Spectralisms in the Music of Rozalie Hirs and Their Points of Departure in Research and Innovation’, Oxford Handbook of Spectral Music (online), Oxford University Press, England, UK, 2023.
- R. Hirs, ‘Spectralisms in the Music of Rozalie Hirs and Their Points of Departure in Research and Innovation’, Oxford Handbook of Spectral Music (book), Oxford University Press, England, UK, 2025.

=== Poetry books ===
- R. Hirs, Locus (in Dutch). Amsterdam: Querido, 1998. ISBN 90-214-6643-0
- R. Hirs, Logos (in Dutch). Amsterdam: Querido, 2002. ISBN 90-214-6708-9
- R. Hirs, [Speling] (in Dutch). Amsterdam: Querido, 2005. ISBN 90-214-6734-8
- R. Hirs, Geluksbrenger (in Dutch). Amsterdam: Querido, 2008. ISBN 978-90-214-3503-9
- Hirs, Rozalie (2012). gestamelde werken (in Dutch). Amsterdam: Querido. ISBN 978-90-214-4243-3.
- Hirs, Rozalie (2014). ein tag (in German). Berlin: hochroth Verlag. ISBN 978-39-028-7150-3. (German translations by Ard Posthuma, Rozalie Hirs)
- R. Hirs, život mogućnosti (in Serbian). Banja Luka: Biblioteka Prevodi, 2014. ISBN 978-99-955-8050-6. (Serbian, Croatian translations: Jelica Novaković, Radovan Lučić; introduction by Laurens Ham)
- Hirs, Rozalie (2017). gestammelte werke (in German). Berlin: kookbooks. ISBN 978-3-937445-67-0. Archived from the original on 2019-10-27. (German translations: Rozalie Hirs, Daniela Seel, Ard Posthuma; English translations: Donald Gardner, Ko Kooman, Willem Groenwegen, Moze Jacobs; Chinese translations: Aurea Sison; Spanish translations: Diego Puls; Albanian translations: Anton Papleka; Swedish translations: Boerje Bohlin; Serbian, Croatian translations: Jelica Novaković, Radovan Lučić; Lithuanian translations: Ausra Gudaviciute, Gytis Norvilas; Russian translations: Nina Targan Mouravi; introduction by Rozalie Hirs)
- Hirs, Rozalie (2017). verdere bijzonderheden (in Dutch). Amsterdam: Querido. ISBN 978-90-214-0857-6. Nomination Karel van de Woestijne Poetry Prize (2017-2019), Sint-Martens-Latem, East Flanders, Belgium. Public Choice Award Karel van de Woestijne 2020, Sint-Martens-Latem, East Flanders, Belgium.
- R. Hirs, ahora es una rosa (in Spanish). Montevideo: Yauguru Books, Uruguay, 2019. ISBN 978-9974-890-33-6. (Spanish translations: Diego Puls)
- R. Hirs spor al lykkebringer (in Danish), Copenhagen: Melodika Forlaget, Denmark, 2021. ISBN 978-87-972522-4-6. (Danish translations: Birthe Lundsgaard)
- Hirs, Rozalie (2021). oneindige zin (in Dutch). Amsterdam: Querido. ISBN 978-90-214-3664-7.
- Hirs, Rozalie (2023). ecologica (in Dutch). Rotterdam: Vleugels. ISBN 978-94-93186-86-6. Jan Campert Prize 2023.
- Hirs, Rozalie (2024). dagtekening van liefdesvormen (in Dutch). Amsterdam: Querido. ISBN 978-90-21489-70-4.
- Hirs, Rozalie (2026). vragen naar het begin (in Dutch). Amsterdam: Querido. ISBN 978-90-25321-67-3.

== Personal life ==
Since 14 February 2007 Rozalie Hirs has been married to the Dutch architect Machiel Spaan. The couple currently lives in Amsterdam.
