= Machiel Spaan =

Dutch architect and educator (born 1966)

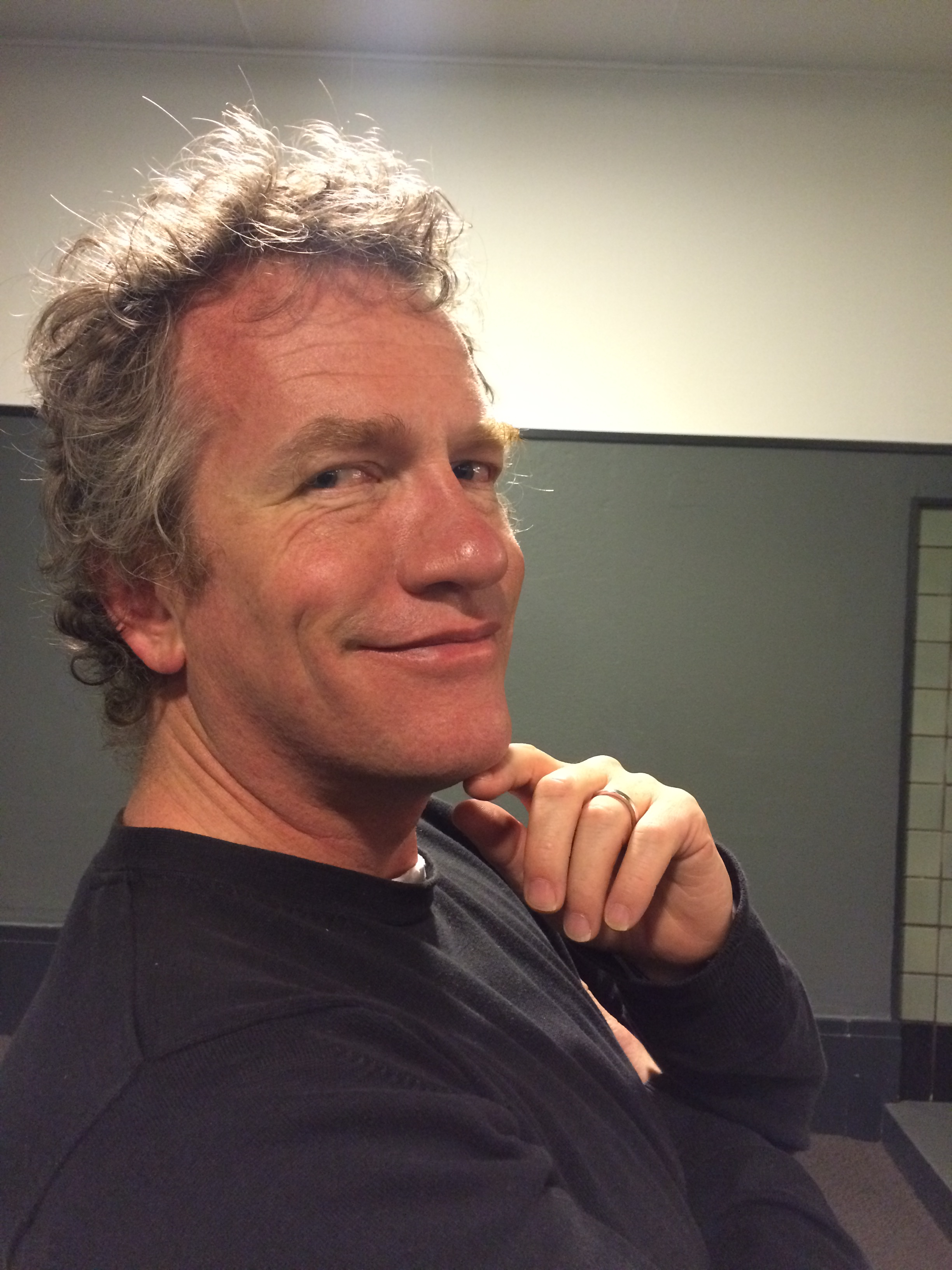
- Born: Machiel Albertus Wilhelmus Spaan; 5 December 1966 (age 59); Nijmegen, Netherlands
- Occupations: Architect, educator
- Website: www.m3h.nl

Machiel Spaan (born 5 December 1966) is a Dutch architect and educator.

== Biography ==
Machiel Spaan was born on 5 December 1966 in Nijmegen. He studied architecture at the Eindhoven University of Technology from 1985 until 1992. Upon his master's degree in 1992 he founded M3H architecten, Amsterdam, of which he has remained owner together with architect Marc Reniers. Since 1994 Spaan has created more than forty apartment buildings in The Netherlands, mostly within the existing city of Amsterdam. His buildings have been selected for the Yearbook of Dutch Architecture in 2013/14 and 2015/16. In 2016, his apartment building De Smaragd won the Zuiderkerk Prize, the most prestigious architecture prize awarded by the city of Amsterdam.

Since 2000 Spaan has been a professor of architecture at the ArtEZ University of Arts and the Amsterdam University of the Arts respectively. From 2007 until 2012 he was Head of the Department of Architecture at the Amsterdam University of the Arts. As part of the Erasmus Programme he initiated, curated, and has taught a workshop series in seven European countries since 2008. In his educational projects, such as Tastenderwijs (2004), The Temporary Expert (2004–07), Building Tectonics (2007–14), Crafting the façade (2015-17), Spaan largely focusses on the creation of sensory experiences of architecture through engagement with materials and exploration of form. In collaboration with the landscape architect Bruno Doedens, he created the three environmental workshops Pannenland (2013), Wadland (2014), and Windwerk (2016), engaging with the landscape in an ongoing process of transformation. A hallmark of Spaan's approach is an active engagement with the design question, taking confluence as a starting point. Questioning the physical, social, and historical context in an ongoing process towards innovation of the architectural form.

=== Selected works by Spaan/ M3H architecten ===
- De Mokumer, Van Beuningenstraat, Amsterdam, the Netherlands, 2005. Zuiderkerk Prize 2005 (nominated)
- Wooden Houses, Wenslauerstraat, Amsterdam, the Netherlands, 2013. Amsterdamse Nieuwbouw Prize 2014 (second prize)
- De Boetzelaer, Boetzelaerplein, Amsterdam, 2013.
- Tugelawegblokken, Tugelaweg, Amsterdam, the Netherlands, 2015. Amsterdamse Nieuwbouw Prize 2016 (nominated); Arie Keppler Prize 2016 (first prize in the category Residential buildings); Brick Award 2018 (nominated)
- De Smaragd, Insulindeweg, Amsterdam, the Netherlands, 2016. Zuiderkerk Prize 2016 (first prize); Arie Keppler Prize 2018 (nominated)
- The Listening House (interdisciplinary sound architecture installation, with composer Rozalie Hirs, 2017).
- De Lootsborger, Lootsstraat & Borgerstraat, Amsterdam, the Netherlands, 2019.
- Ways of Space (interdisciplinary architectural sound installation, with composer Rozalie Hirs, 2019). Supported by Stimuleringsfonds Creatieve Industrie, STEIM, Van Doesburghuis, and Mondriaan Fonds.
- Langs de Lijn, IJburglaan, Zeeburgereiland, Amsterdam, The Netherlands, 2019.
- De Zeebloem, Molukkenstraat, Soendastraat, Madurastraat & Billitonstraat, Amsterdam, the Netherlands, 2020.
- Terrazza, John Blankensteinstraat & Faas Wilkesstraat, Zeeburgereiland, Amsterdam, the Netherlands, 2020.
- Rozenprieel, Haarlem, The Netherlands, 2021.
- Kaap Hoorn, Grote Waal, Hoorn, The Netherlands, 2021.
- De Nieuwezijds, De Krijgsman, Muiden, The Netherlands, 2022.
- Poortgebouw Noord, Wickevoort Estate, Haarlemmermeer, The Netherlands, 2022.
- Lariks, Houthavens, Amsterdam, The Netherlands, 2023.
- 9 Houten Huizen, Schuttersbos, Eindhoven, The Netherlands, 2025.

=== Selected publications ===
- The Revolving Earth (M. Spaan, English translation: M. Speer), Architectura and Natura (G. Bekkers, ed.), Amsterdam, 2026 ISBN 978-94-6140-082-6
- The Wandering Maker (M. Spaan; English translation: M. Speer), Architectura and Natura (G. Bekkers, ed.), Amsterdam, the Netherlands, 2019 ISBN 978-94-6140-066-6
- Crafting the Façade. Stone, Brick, Wood. A handbook of innovative concepts for design and construction of building façades (U. Meister, C. Rist-Stadelman, M. Spaan, eds.), Park Books, Zürich, Switzerland, 2018. ISBN 978-3-03860-101-2
- Forum (M. Spaan, M. Maaskant, E. Ronner, L. Kramer, B. de Baets, S. Kassenaar, eds.). Architecture Magazine (10 editions), Architectura et Amicitia, Amsterdam, the Netherlands, 2018-2025 ISSN 2212-4829
- A short walk through space and sound - Seven notes by Machiel Spaan (M. Spaan; Engelse vertaling: Billy Nolen), area 154 - acoustic temples, area Magazine, Milaan, Italy, 2017
- The merit of sauntering (M. Spaan), X Agendas for architecture, Artifice, London, UK, 2016. ISBN 978-1-908967-76-3 pp 109–111
- New attitudes: designing in times of transformation (K. de Jong, A. Oxenaar, M. Kloos, M. Spaan, eds.), Architectura and Natura, Amsterdam, the Netherlands, 2013. ISBN 978-94-61400-29-1
- Musical approaches to Space (M. Spaan). Music, Space and Architecture, Architectura and Natura, Amsterdam, the Netherlands, 2012. pp 77–93
- Music, Space and Architecture (K. de Jong, A. Oxenaar, M. Kloos, M. Spaan, eds.), Architectura and Natura, Amsterdam, the Netherlands, 2012. ISBN 978-94-614-0005-5
