= Bojan Đorđev =

Serbian theater director (born 1977)

Bojan Đorđev (Serbian: Бојан Ђорђев, born 1977) is a Serbian theatre director and theorist. Đorđev was born in Belgrade, SFR Yugoslavia. He enrolled in the University of Arts in Belgrade, Faculty of Dramatic Arts where he studied theatre and radio directing, graduating in 2001. He earned his post-graduate degree from the same institution in 2007 with a thesis on the works of Bertolt Brecht. He continued his studied at the Amsterdam University of the Arts.
