= De Telegraaf =

Dutch newspaper

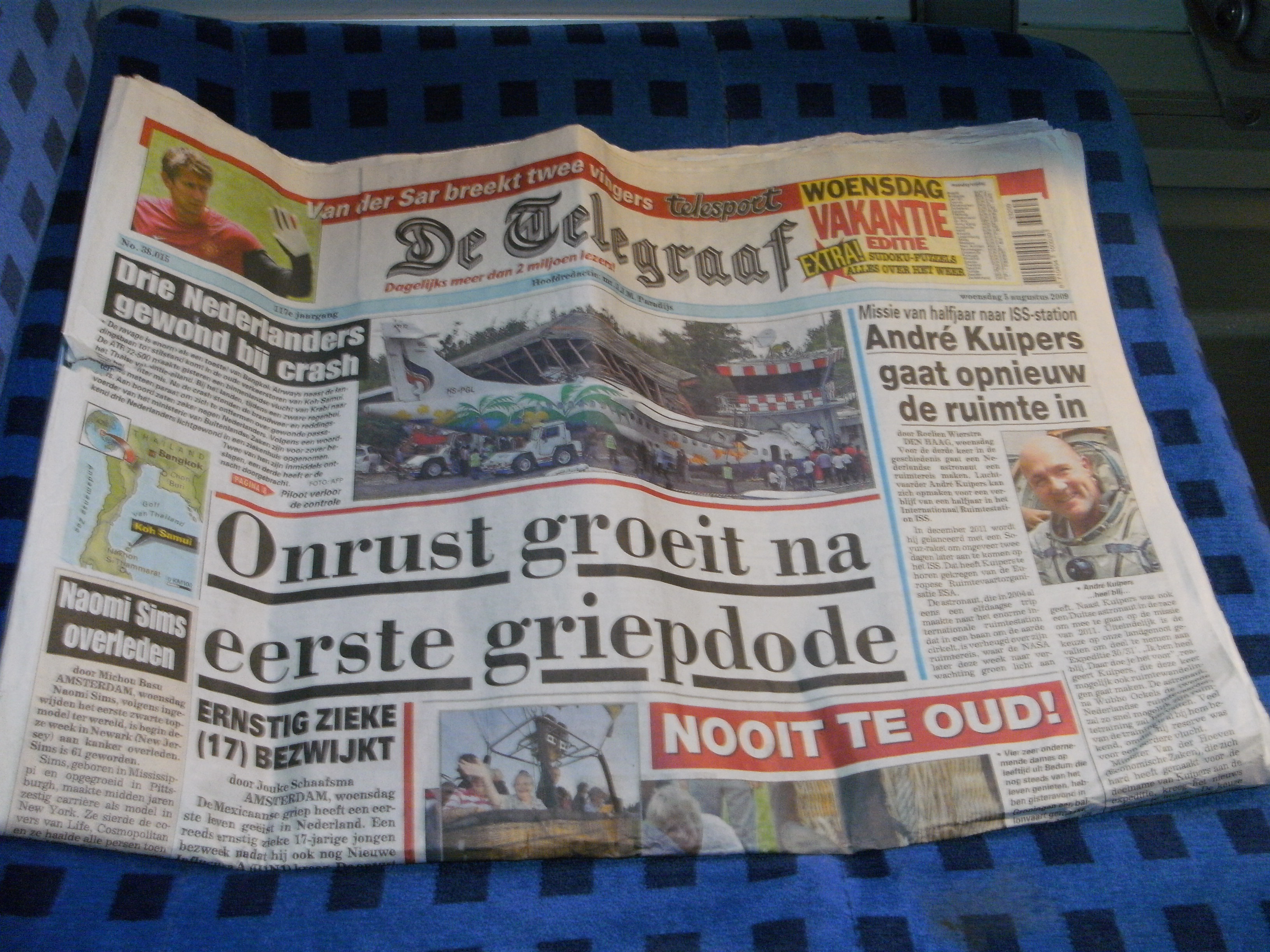
- Type: Daily morning newspaper
- Format: Compact
- Owner: Mediahuis
- Editor-in-chief: Kamran Ullah; Esther Wemmers
- Founded: 1 January 1893; 133 years ago
- Language: Dutch
- Headquarters: Basisweg 30; Amsterdam, Netherlands
- Circulation: ▼393,537 (2017)
- Website: www.telegraaf.nl

De Telegraaf (Dutch pronunciation: [də teːləˈɣraːf]; English: The Telegraph) is the largest Dutch daily morning newspaper. Paul Jansen has been the editor-in-chief since August 2015. De Telegraaf is based in Amsterdam and is owned by the Belgian company Mediahuis.

== History ==
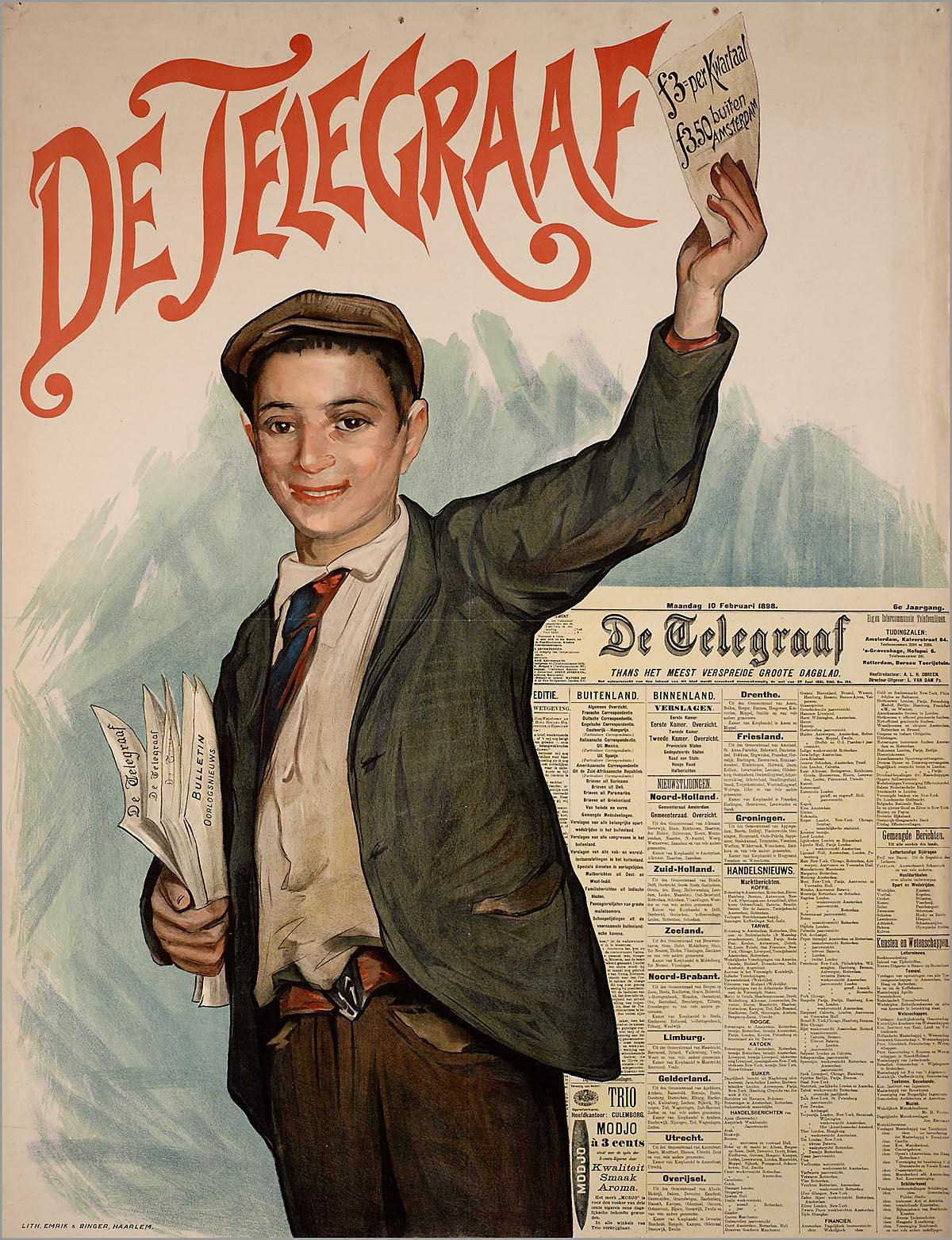
Advertisement poster, 1898

=== 19th century ===
De Telegraaf was founded by Henry Tindal, who simultaneously started another paper De Courant (lit. 'The Gazette'). The first issue appeared on 1 January 1893.

=== 20th century ===
Following Tindal's death on 31 January 1902 the printer HMC Holdert, with backing from financiers, took over De Telegraaf and De Courant on 12 September 1902. This proved to be a good investment, particularly with regard to De Courant, enabling Holdert between 1903 and 1923 to take over one newspaper after another, suspending publication as he went. He added the name Amsterdamsche Courant ("Amsterdam Gazette") as a subtitle to De Telegraaf, and Het Nieuws van den Dag ("The News of the Day") to De Courant.

During World War I, when the Netherlands was officially neutral, Holdert's French sympathies and his pro-British standpoint caused De Telegraaf to be the focus of some controversy, as the Netherlands were usually pro-German at the time.

In 1926, Holdert began construction of a new printing facility at the Nieuwezijds Voorburgwal in Amsterdam, designed by J. F. Staal and G. J. Langhout. Construction was completed and the building occupied in 1930.

During World War II, the Telegraaf companies published pro-Nazi German papers, which led to a thirty-year ban on publishing after the war. The prohibition was lifted in 1949 and De Telegraaf flourished anew to become the biggest newspaper in the Netherlands.

At one point, in June 1966, the Telegraaf building was besieged by angry construction workers and Provo followers, after a false report that a victim of a labour dispute had been killed not by the police but by a co-worker. In 1974, De Telegraaf moved to a new location on the Basisweg.

In 1995–1996 De Telegraaf had a circulation of 760,000 copies, making it the best-selling paper in the country.

De Courant/Nieuws van de Dag ceased publication in 1998. In 1999, the circulation of the paper was 808,000 copies, making it the ninth best-selling European newspaper.

=== 21st century ===
De Telegraaf was the eighth top European newspaper with a circulation of 807,000 copies in 2001. It added a Sunday edition on 21 March 2004. The Sunday edition was dropped on 27 December 2009. Circulation was 488,902 copies in 2013. De Telegraaf changed from broadsheet to compact format in October 2014. In 2014, was 455,727, dropping to 430,686 in 2015. Distribution had been reduced to 393,537 in 2017.

On 26 June 2018, a delivery van intentionally rammed into the office building of De Telegraaf, catching fire afterwards which was probably started by the driver who made his getaway with another car. The building took considerable damage. Police believe the attack was done within organized crime circles; four days earlier the building of Panorama was also a target, possibly because both publications write about serious crime.

== Editorial content ==
The newspaper contains many sensational and sports-related articles, and one or more pages supplied by the gossip-magazine Privé ("Private"). The financial news coverage is more serious in tone. The paper targets a broad audience, mostly in a conservative and populist style.
