= Jan Frederik Staal =

Dutch architect (1879–1940)

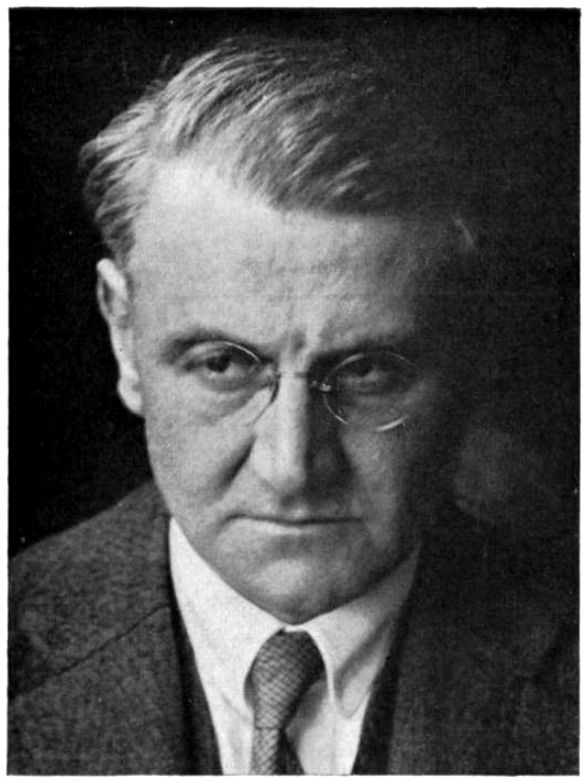
Ir. J. F. Staal, 1938

Jan Frederik ("Frits") Staal (Amsterdam, 28 February 1879 – Amsterdam, 8 April 1940), was a Dutch architect, and a major figure in the development of modern architecture in the Netherlands in the first half of the twentieth century. He was the father of the architects Arthur and Georges Staal and the linguist and South Asia scholar Jan Frederik Staal (also nicknamed "Frits").

== Career ==
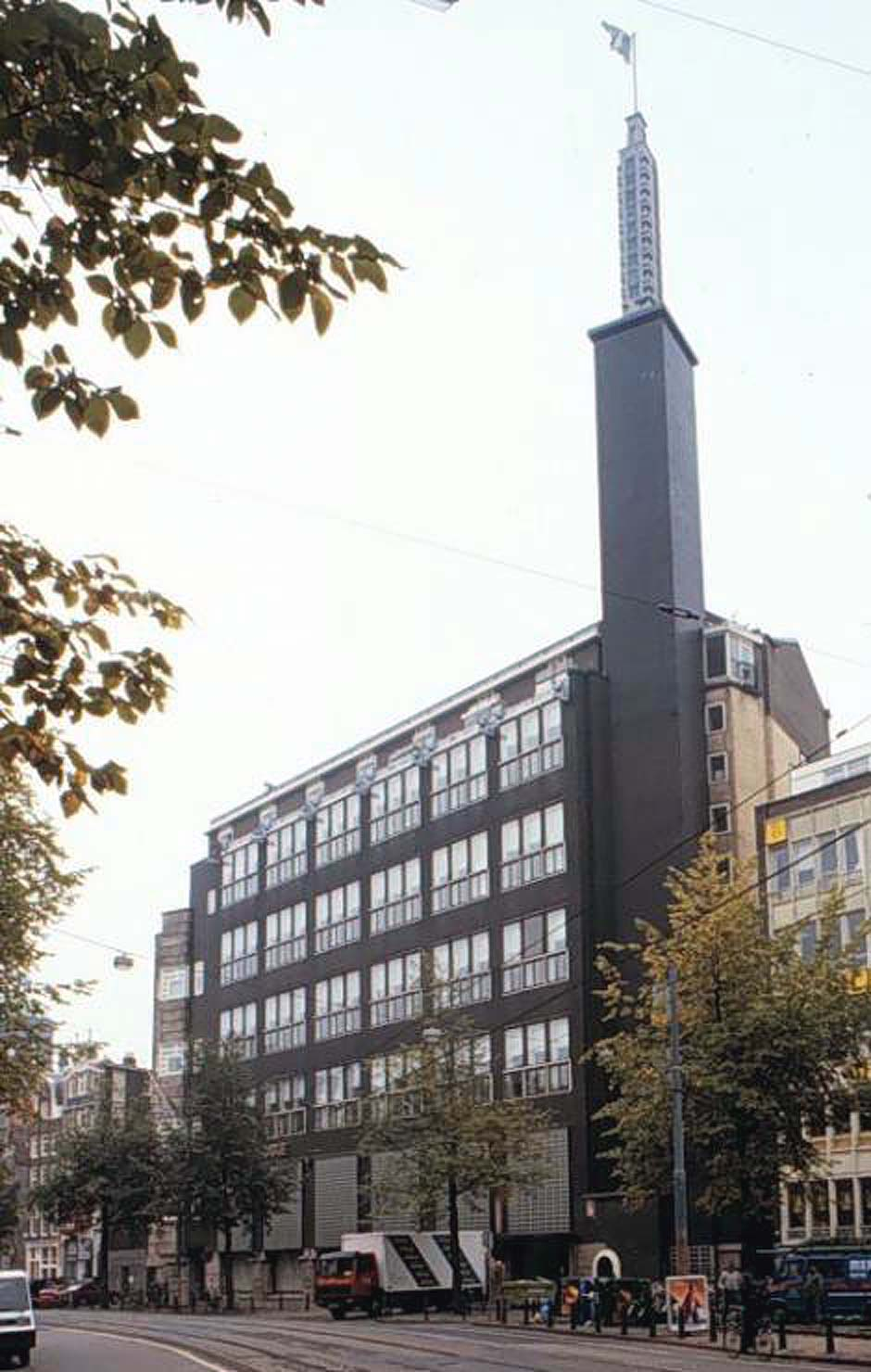
The former Telegraaf headquarters on the Nieuwezijds Voorburgwal in Amsterdam.

Jan Frederik Staal was born into a family of builders in Amsterdam. His father was a partner in the contracting firm Staal and Haalmeyer, in whose office J.F. Staal began working around the turn of the century. It was there in 1902 that he met Alexander Jacobus Kropholler, with whom he formed a partnership in 1903. Initially, the designs of the partners were constructed by his father's firm. One of the first of these were the offices of the life insurance company De Utrecht, located on the Damrak in central Amsterdam, which are still used by the company and constitute a striking example of Dutch Nieuwe Kunst (Art Nouveau) architecture in the city. At the same time, they completed another branch office for the company in Leeuwarden.

Staal and Kropholler dissolved their partnership in 1910, after which time Staal began to move closer to the design currents of the Amsterdam School, which would coalesce in the Netherlands while the country remained neutral during World War I. His first realizations in this vein were the villa in the Park Meerwijk in Bergen (1917–18); the central flower markets in Aalsmeer; a 12-story "skyscraper" in Amsterdam; the Dutch pavilion at the 1925 International Exhibition of Modern Decorative and Industrial Arts in Paris (the 1925 exposition which later gave us the name "Art Deco"); the new headquarters of the newspaper De Telegraaf on the Nieuwezijds Voorburgwal in Amsterdam (with G.J. Langhout); the Koopmansbeurs in Rotterdam; and various homes in the Amsterdam Rivierenbuurt (River District). In 1920 he also entered the competition for an opera house on the Museumplein in Amsterdam, which he won, but his plan of the opera house was never built. Later he would reuse the motifs from this project on the Aalsmeer flower market and the Telegraaf building.

Towards the end of his career Staal eventually evolved into a disciple of the Neue Sachlichkeit (New Objectivity, or the International Style), a development that can be seen in his housing blocks constructed in the Apollolaan, Beethovenstraat, Corellistraat and Bachstraat sections of Amsterdam. His buildings on the Apollolaan/Beethovenstraat are particularly characteristic of his turn towards the New Objectivity with their large, tight bay windows, as are the single-family houses he designed on the even-numbered side of the Corellistraat. They contrast markedly with the earlier residential structures he built on the JM Coenenstraat.

Staal became an important figure in the history of Dutch modern architecture. For a number of years he served as a board member of the Dutch professional society of architects Architecture et Amicitia, which from 1914 onwards held its meetings in a bank building on the Herengracht in Amsterdam that Staal had designed. From 1920 to 1930 he also served on the editorial staff of the Dutch design magazine Wendingen. His career flourished as a result of these contacts, including the major figures in the Amsterdam School, such as Hendrik T. Wijdeveld, Michel de Klerk, and Piet Kramer.

The first monograph on Staal, Jan Frederik Staal (1879–1940) – The Will of the Building and the Will of the Time, appeared in 2015, authored by Hans Willem Bakx and published by the Bonas Foundation.

== Politics and personal life ==
Staal was a lifelong socialist, and even joined the Communist Party in the Netherlands.

From 1936 until his death he was married to the architect and designer Margaret Staal-Kropholler (1891–1966), with whom he had a relationship for much longer and who was initially his assistant. She was the sister of Staal's former partner Alexander Kropholler. They are buried in the New Eastern Cemetery in Amsterdam.

Staal had five children, four of whom from relationships he had before he married his wife. His son Arthur Staal (1907–1993) was also an architect and in 1966 designed the Overhoeks Tower in Amsterdam-Noord. His son Georges Staal was also an architect and a third son Fred Staal, died in the Dutch East Indies. A fourth son was the linguist Frits Staal (1930–2012), who, however, had a different mother than Arthur, Georges and Fred. Margareth, or Maggie Venekamp-Staal, was his youngest child, from his marriage to Margaret.

== Works ==
- 1903: De Utrecht branch office, Leeuwarden (with A. Kropholler)
- 1905: De Utrecht headquarters, Amsterdam, Damrak 28-30 (with A. Kropholler)
- 1905: De Utrecht shops, Amsterdam, Damrak 26 (with A. Kropholler)
- 1905: De Utrecht fire station, Hilvarenbeek (with A. Kropholler)
- 1906: De Utrecht archive building, Utrecht (with A. Kropholler; demolished)
- 1906: De Utrecht branch office, Choorstraat 14, Utrecht (with A. Kropholler)
- 1913: Amsterdamsche Handelsbank, Herengracht, Amsterdam
- 1915–1918: Park Meerwijk with the villas De Ark, De Bark, Bilbad, Elifaz en Zofar, Bergen, (North Holland)
- 1919–1920: Eigen Huis housing complex, Linnaeusparkweg, Amsterdam
- 1922–1923: J.M. Coenenstraat housing complex, Amsterdam
- 1925: Dutch Pavilion for the Exposition des arts décoratifs et industriels, Paris (demolished)
- 1927–1928: Aalsmeer Auction House, Aalsmeer
- 1927–1930: De Telegraaf Headquarters, Nieuwezijds Voorburgwal, Amsterdam
- 1927–1930: The 12-Story House ("De Wolkenkrabber"; The Skyscraper), Amsterdam
- 1935: Uitbreiding, a Jewish home for the elderly and disabled, Weesperplein, Amsterdam
- 1935–1940: Exchange, Rotterdam
- 1938–1939: Housing at the corner of Apollolaan (65–85) and Beethovenstraat (3–9), Amsterdam
