= Beurs-World Trade Center =

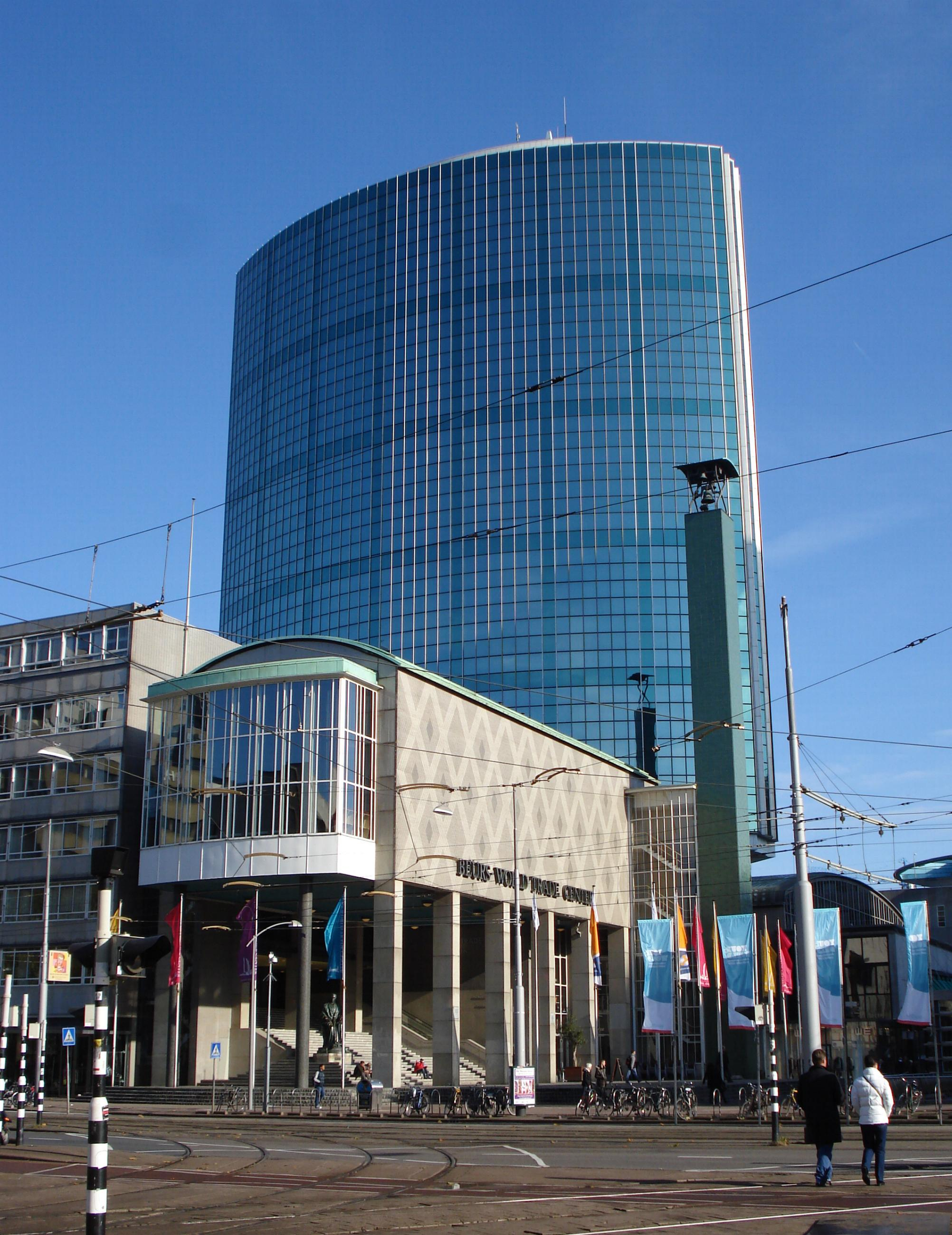
- Beurs-World Trade Center
- Interactive map of the Beurs-World Trade Center area

General information
- Status: Functioning
- Type: Office
- Location: Rotterdam, Netherlands
- Coordinates: 51°55′15″N 4°28′52″E
- Construction started: 1984
- Completed: 1987

Height
- Roof: 93 m (305 ft)

Design and construction
- Architect: Rob van Erk

Beurs-World Trade Center is located on the Coolsingel and Beursplein in the centre of Rotterdam.

It is a major business centre in Rotterdam with approximately 200 offices. The building is 93 meters high. The center is a member of the international World Trade Centers Association.

== History ==
Beurs-WTC's history dates back to 1598, the year the first Rotterdam Beurs was founded. This fair proved extremely successful. Later lack of space led to the creation of larger exhibition buildings of which the building at the Westnieuwland was the longest existing (1736–1940). This building was designed by Adriaen van der Werff.

The low-rise of the current fair complex was designed by architect Jan Frederik Staal with interiors by Margaret Staal-Kropholler and was built between 1936 and 1940. In the Rotterdam Blitz on 14 May 1940 the exhibition centre took a number of hits, but the damage could be repaired quickly. In 1941, the Stock Exchange reopened on Coolsingel. This building with many features included not only many trade fairs but also shops, conference rooms, a bar and offices.

In 1973 an extra floor was added to the low-rise building. Architect of this expansion is Arthur Staal, the son of J. F. Staal. There is also a catering establishment which carries the name "Staal". There are many business people their daily lunch in the restaurant on the second floor, or in summer on the terrace below and to the Coolsingel Beursplein. On the third floor, still room language, the former meeting room of the Chamber of Commerce. This is now used for weddings, conferences, parties, and so forth.

In 1984 the construction of a new office tower in the middle of the existing low-rise began. The green elliptical tower, designed by architect Rob van Erk, was completed in 1987. Queen Beatrix opened and named the entire construction the Beurs-World Trade Center. Currently the Beurs-WTC is home to a trade show, the Insurance Exchange. The Beurs-World Trade Center is owned and operated by Beurs Rotterdam NV which also owns the building. The Beurs-WTC is easily accessible by public transport, metro station Beurs the front door. The Beurs-WTC also has a private parking garage.

== See also ==
- List of world trade centers
- List of tallest buildings in Rotterdam
