= Anne Hartkamp =

Anne Hartkamp (born 1964) is a German jazz singer, songwriter, composer and educator. She has also performed under the pseudonym of Magnolia for a time.

Hartkamp, who grew up between Essen and Düsseldorf, first studied classical singing in Vienna before switching to German and musicology at the University of Bonn. There she approached jazz autodidactically and then studied jazz singing at the Amsterdam University of the Arts (Amsterdamse Hogeschool voor de Kunsten) with Deborah Brown, Humphrey Campbell and Erik van Lier. After her studies she moved to Cologne. In the early 1990s she co-founded the a cappella quartet Harem 4, with whom she gave numerous concerts in Germany and abroad. Under the pseudonym Magnolia she also gave solo concerts and worked with Gunter Hampel from 1997, but occasionally also with Marion Brown and Perry Robinson.

After the break-up of Harem 4 in 2001, she concentrated on German-language songs (with her own lyrics) and founded the band hartkamp. With her quintet, she also explored jazz standards. From 2005 Hartkamp played in the duo Magnolia with guitarist Philipp van Endert, with whom she released the albums "Humpty's Amazing Boogie Pencil" in 2006 and "Wait a Second" in 2012."

In a duo with Thomas Rückert, she explored the work of pianist Bill Evans on the 2013 album Dear Bill, which includes a vocal of "How My Heart Sings". Saarländischer Rundfunk stated that the album had " a lot of sincere feeling" while JazzThing remarked on the "silence, depth and emotionality" and "expressive pieces of music that are touching throughout". She has also worked with the WDR Big Band of Cologne, Thomas Heberer, Lajos Dudas, Axel Dörner, Michael Wollny and Nils Wogram. In 2016 she released Songs & Dances on Double Moon Records with Thomas Rückert, André Nendza and Oliver Rehmann.

Hartkamp teaches jazz singing at the Osnabrück University of Applied Sciences in Osnabrück, Lower Saxony.
