= Frits Staal =

Dutch indologist (1930–2012)

- Born: 3 November 1930; Amsterdam, Netherlands
- Died: 19 February 2012 (aged 81); Chiangmai, Thailand
- Father: Jan Frederik Staal

Academic background
- Education: University of Amsterdam; University of Madras

Academic work
- Discipline: philosophy
- Sub-discipline: Indian philosophy
- Institutions: University of London; University of Amsterdam; University of California, Berkeley
- Main interests: Vedic ritual and mantras
- Notable works: Rules without Meaning

Johan Frederik "Frits" Staal (3 November 1930 – 19 February 2012) was the department founder and Emeritus Professor of Philosophy and South/Southeast Asian Studies at the University of California, Berkeley. Staal specialized in the study of Vedic ritual and mantras, and the scientific exploration of ritual and mysticism. He was also a scholar of Greek and Indian logic and philosophy and Sanskrit grammar.

== Biography ==
Staal was born in Amsterdam, the son of the architect Jan Frederik Staal. In 1954, Staal earned his undergraduate degree from the University of Amsterdam focused in mathematics, physics, and philosophy. In 1957, he earned his doctorate from the University of Madras focused on Indian philosophy and Sanskrit. After earning his doctorate, he served as a lecturer in Sanskrit at the School of Oriental and African Studies, University of London from 1958 to 1962. From 1961 to 1962, he searched as an Assistant and Associate Professor of Indian Philosophy at the University of Pennsylvania. Staal was Professor of General and Comparative Philosophy in Amsterdam from 1962 to 1967. In 1968, he became Professor of Philosophy and South Asian Languages at the University of California, Berkeley, and he retired in 1991.

In 1979, Staal became a corresponding member of the Royal Netherlands Academy of Arts and Sciences.

Staal retired to Thailand, and died at his home in Chiangmai, aged 81, on February 19, 2012.

== Work ==
Staal argued that the ancient Indian grammarians, especially Pāṇini, had completely mastered methods of linguistic theory not rediscovered again until the 1950s and the applications of modern mathematical logic to linguistics by Noam Chomsky. (Chomsky himself has said that the first generative grammar in the modern sense was Panini's grammar). The early methods allowed the construction of discrete, potentially infinite generative systems. Remarkably, these early linguistic systems were codified orally, though writing was then used to develop them in some way. The formal basis for Panini's methods involved the use of "auxiliary" markers, rediscovered in the 1930s by the logician Emil Post. Post's rewrite systems are now a standard approach for the description of computer languages.

In 1975, a consortium of scholars, led by Staal, documented the twelve-day performance, in Panjal village, Kerala, of the Vedic Agnicayana ritual, which is available as a documentary titled Altar of Fire. It was thought possible that this would be the last performance of the ritual, but it has since been revived.

In Rules without Meaning Staal controversially suggested that mantras "predate language in the development of man in a chronological sense". He pointed out that there is evidence that ritual existed before language, and argued that syntax was influenced by ritual.

His more recent study was concerned with Greek and Vedic geometry. He drew a parallel between geometry and linguistics, writing that, "Pāṇini is the Indian Euclid." Staal's point is that Pāṇini showed how to extend spoken Sanskrit to a formal metalanguage for the language itself.

== Bibliography ==
English

- Advaita and Neoplatonism, University of Madras, 1961.
- Nambudiri Veda Recitation, The Hague: Mouton, 1961.
- Word Order in Sanskrit and Universal Grammar, Dordrecht: Reidel, 1967.
- A Reader on the Sanskrit Grammarians, Cambridge Mass.: MIT, 1972.
- Exploring Mysticism. A Methodological Essay, Penguin Books; Berkeley: University of California Press, 1975.
- The Science of Ritual, Poona: Bhandarkar Oriental Research Institute, 1982.
- with C. V. Somayajipad and Itti Ravi Nambudiri, AGNI - The Vedic Ritual of the Fire Altar, Vols. I-II, Berkeley: Asian Humanities Press, 1983.
- The Stamps of Jammu and Kashmir, New York: The Collectors Club, 1983.
- Universals. Studies in Indian Logic and Linguistics, Chicago and London: University of Chicago, 1988.
- Staal, Frits (1989). Ritual and Mantras: Rules Without Meaning. Motilal Banarsidass. ISBN 9788120814127.
- Concepts of Science in Europe and Asia, Leiden: International Institute of Asian Studies, 1993, 1994.
- Mantras between Fire and Water. Reflections on a Balinese Rite, Amsterdam: Royal Netherlands Academy of Sciences/North-Holland, 1995.
- "There Is No Religion There." in: The Craft of Religious Studies, ed. Jon R. Stone, New York: St. Martin's Press, 1998, 52-75.
- "Artificial Languages across Sciences and Civilizations," Journal of Indian Philosophy 34, 2006, 89-141.
- Discovering the Vedas: Origins, Mantras, Rituals, Insights Penguin Books India, 2008.

French

- Jouer avec le feu. Pratique et theorie du rituel vedique, Paris: College de France, 1990.

Dutch

- Over zin en onzin in filosofie, religie en wetenschap, Amsterdam: Meulenhoff, 1986.
- Een Wijsgeer in het Oosten. Op reis door Java en Kalimantan, Amsterdam: Meulenhoff, 1988.
- Drie bergen en zeven rivieren: Essays, Amsterdam: Meulenhoff 2004.
