= Lotte de Beer =

Dutch opera director

Lotte de Beer (born 11 August 1981) is a Dutch opera director and administrator.

== Biography ==
Raised in Mheer in the Zuid-Limburg region of Limburg, de Beer studied singing and piano in her youth. She subsequently developed an interest in acting, and studied acting at the Toneelschool Maastricht. She subsequently studied directing at the Amsterdam University of the Arts, from which she graduated in 2009. She was a prizewinner in the Ton Lutz Awards in 2009 for grooste regietalent (greatest directing talent), for her production of Hauptling Abendwind / Vent du Soir. Her mentors have included Peter Konwitschny and Pierre Audi.

In 2010, de Beer founded Operafront, an opera company based in Amsterdam focused on small-scale and experimental productions of opera, and became its first artistic director. Her work with contemporary opera has included directing the premiere productions of the new operas Waiting for Miss Monroe and The New Prince, both for Dutch National Opera.

Outside the Netherlands, de Beer directed the Bavarian State Opera's first full staging of Puccini's Il Trittico, in Italian, in December 2017. She has directed productions at the Bregenz Festival, the Aalto-Musiktheater (Essen), the Theater an der Wien, the Münchener Biennale and Oper Leipzig. In October 2020, the Vienna Volksoper announced the appointment of de Beer as its next artistic director, the first woman ever named to the post, effective 1 September 2022, with an initial contract of 5 years. In June 2024, the Vienna Volksoper announced the extension of de Beer's contract to 2032.

In 2015, de Beer was a prize winner in the Newcomer category of the International Opera Awards in London.

Cultural offices
Preceded by Robert Meyer	Artistic Director, Vienna Volksoper; 2022–present	Succeeded by incumbent
