= Vienna Volksoper =

Building in Vienna, Austria

Volksoper
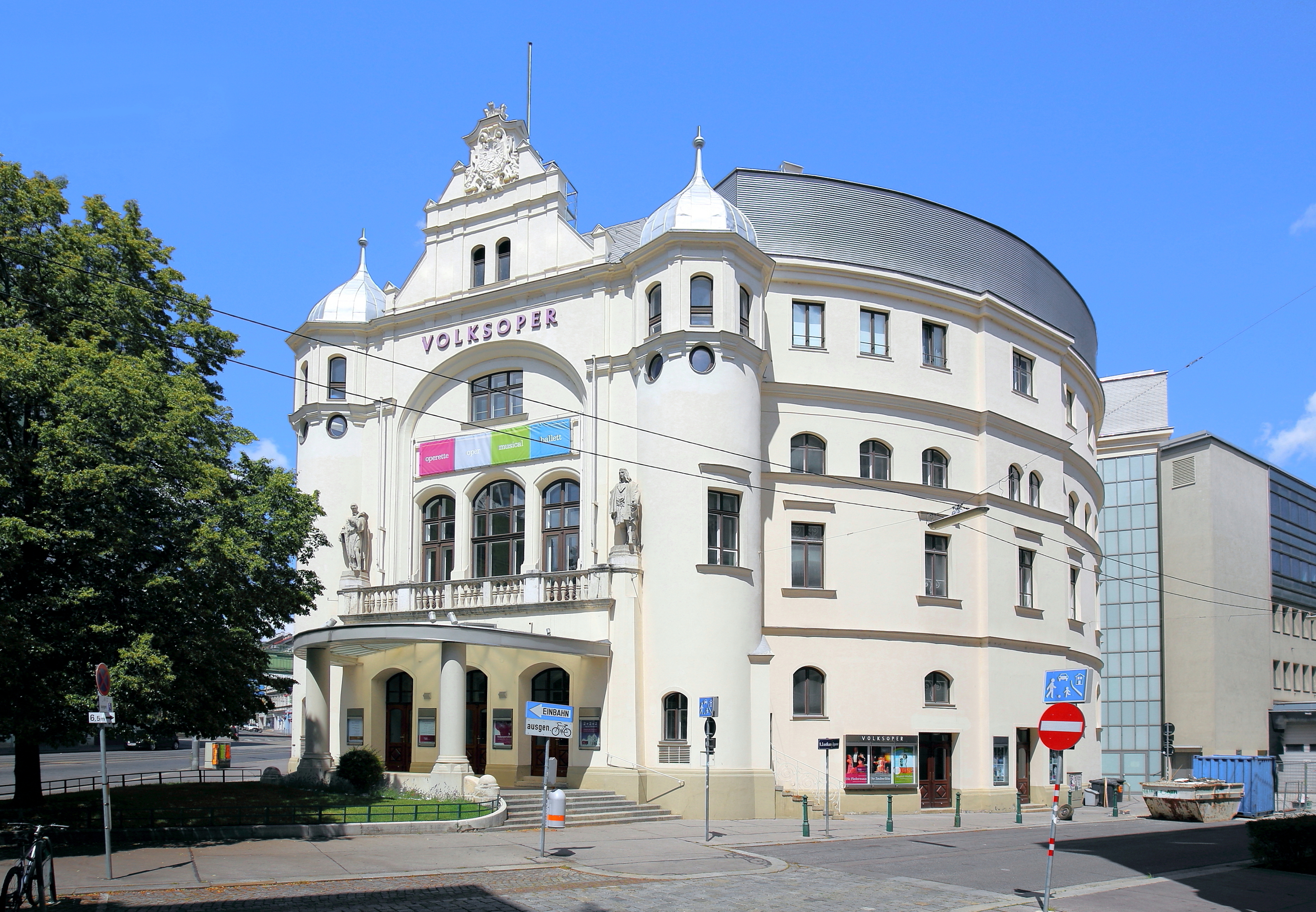
- Formation: 1898
- Location: Vienna, Austria
- Leader: Lotte de Beer
- Parent organization: Bundestheater Holding
- Website: www.volksoper.at
- Building details

General information
- Coordinates: 48°13′29″N 16°20′59″E

Other information
- Seating capacity: 1,261

The Vienna Volksoper (Volksoper or Vienna People's Opera) is an opera house in Vienna, Austria. It produces three hundred performances of twenty-five productions of opera, operetta, musicals, and ballet, during an annual season which runs from September through June.

== History ==
=== Foundation ===
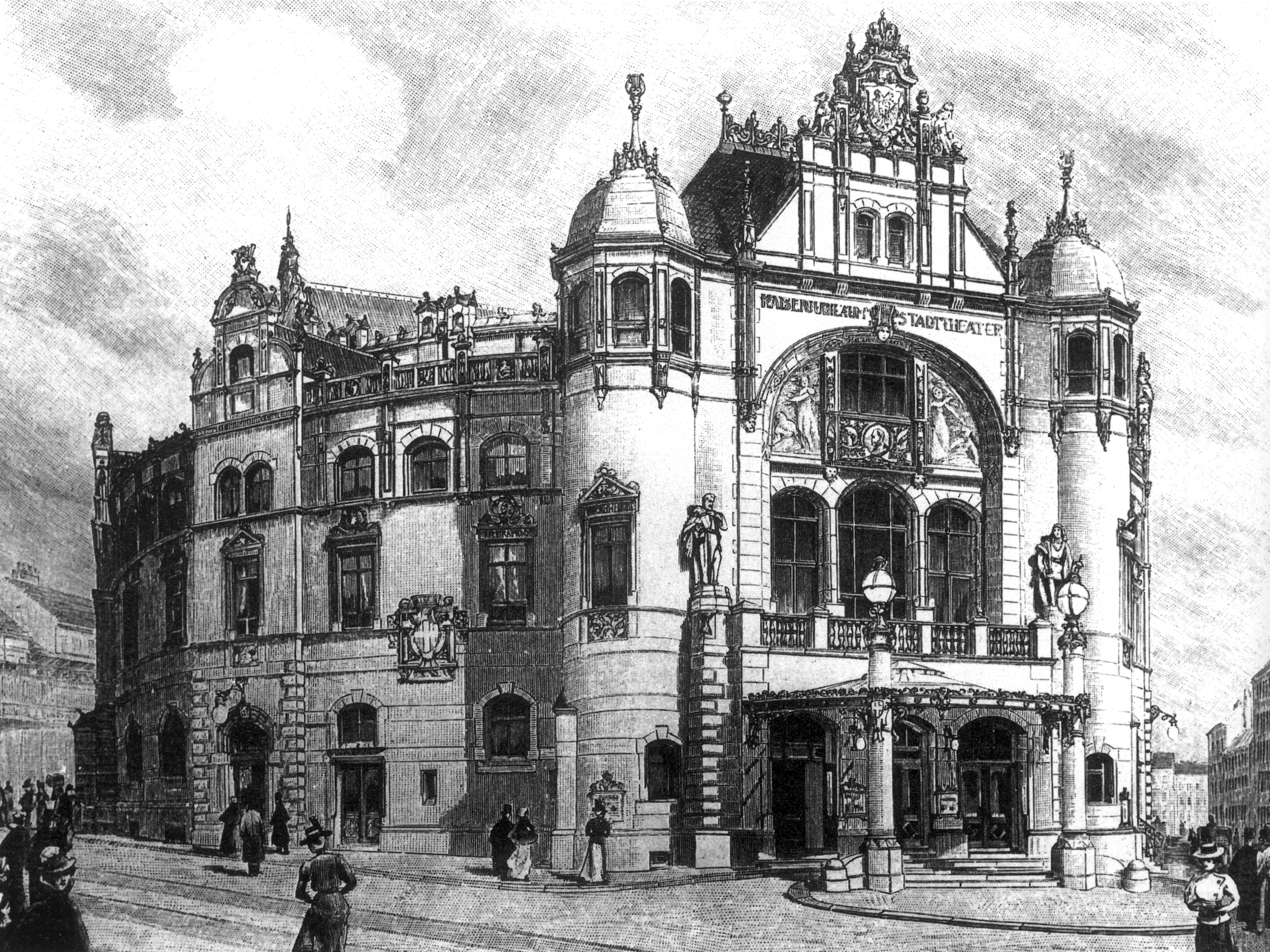
Xylography published 19. January 1899 in "Leipziger Illustrierte"

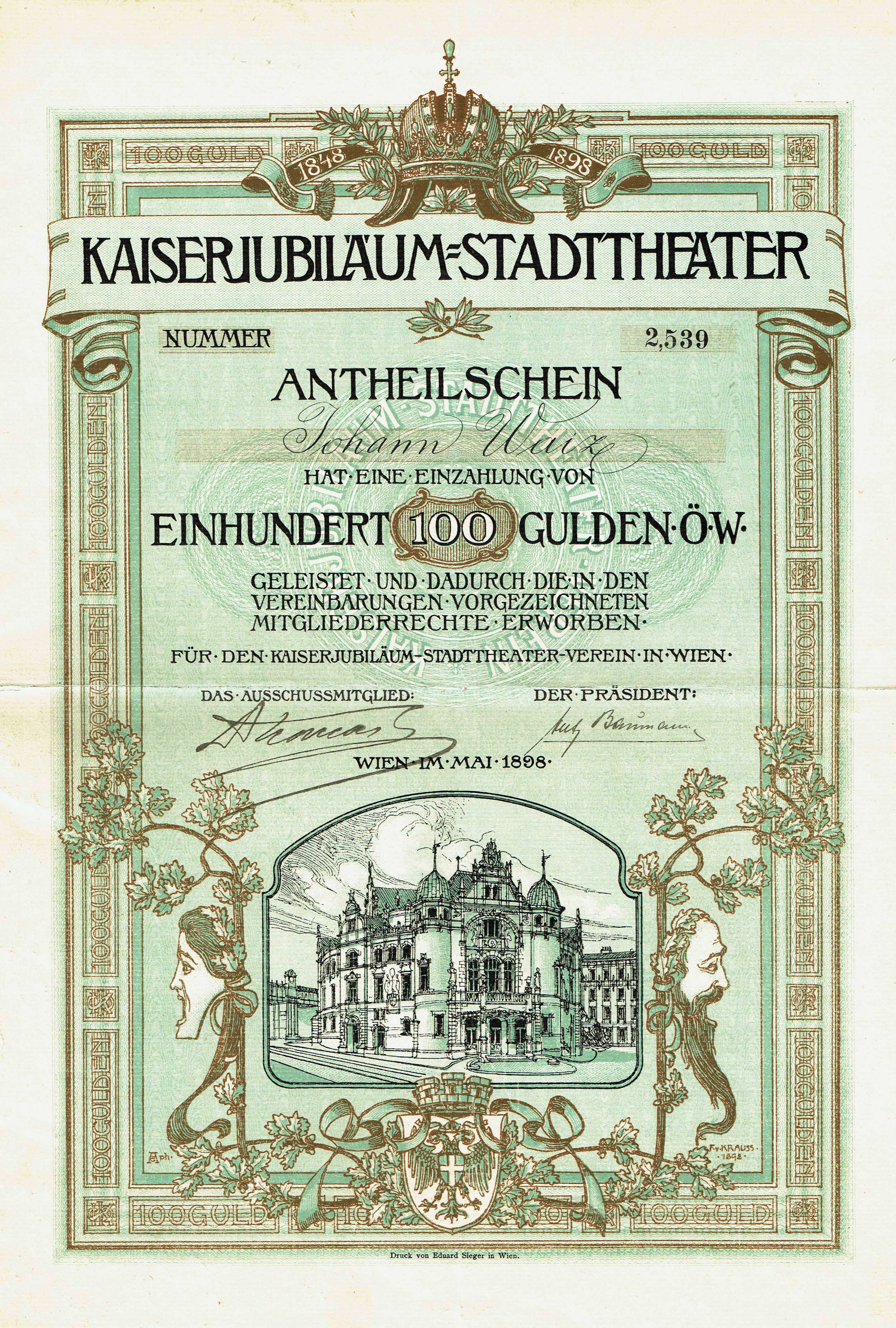
Stock certificate of the Kaiserjubiläum-Stadttheater-Verein, issued May 1898

The Volksoper was built in 1898 as the Kaiserjubiläum-Stadttheater (Kaiser's Jubilee Civic Theatre), originally producing only plays. Because of the very brief construction period (10 months), the first director Adam Müller-Gutenbrunn had to start with debts of 160,000 florins. After this inauspicious startup, the Kaiserjubiläum-Stadttheater had to declare bankruptcy five years later in 1903.

=== Music theater from 1903 to 1950s ===
On 1 September 1903, Rainer Simons took over the house and renamed it the Kaiserjubiläum-Stadttheater - Volksoper (public opera). His intention was to continue the production of plays but also establish series of opera and operetta. The first Viennese performances of Tosca and Salome were given at the Volksoper in 1907 and 1910 respectively. World-famous singers such as Maria Jeritza, Leo Slezak and Richard Tauber appeared there; the conductor Alexander Zemlinsky became the first bandmaster in 1906.

In the years up to and through the First World War the Volksoper attained a position as Vienna's second prestige opera house. In 1919, Felix Weingartner became artistic director and principal conductor. Hugo Gruder-Guntram succeeded Weingartner as artistic director. After 1929, it focused on light opera, and under Gruder-Guntram undertook a number of summer tours to Abbazia in 1935, Cairo and Alexandria in 1937 and throughout Italy in 1938, with guest appearances from Richard Tauber. After the Second World War, the Vienna Volksoper became the alternative venue to the devastated Vienna State Opera. In 1955 the Volksoper returned to its former role of presenting opera, operetta, and musicals.

=== Recent history ===
In 1987, the Volksoper was shown in the James Bond movie The Living Daylights, doubling for a fictional "Ľudové konzervatorium" ("People's Conservatory" - direct translation of "Volksoper" into Slovak) in Bratislava, as Czechoslovakia was still under Communist rule at the time; the interior was, however, filmed at Sofiensaal. In the movie, KGB General Koskov, who is defecting to the West, is attending a performance, and Bond and his handler Saunders cover him from an apartment across the street (in real life across Währingerstraße, the building is a confectionery store "Zum süßen Eck").

From September 1991 to June 1996, the Vienna Volksoper was under a collective leadership with the Vienna State Opera. In 1999, the Volksoper became a 100% subsidiary of the Bundestheater-Holding.

From 2007 to 2022, Robert Meyer headed the Volksoper as artistic director, together with the business manager Christoph Ladstätter. In October 2020, the company announced the appointment of Lotte de Beer as its next artistic director, the first woman ever named to the post, effective 1 September 2022, with an initial contract of 5 years. In December 2020, the company announced the appointment of Omer Meir Wellber as its next music director, effective 1 September 2022, with an initial contract of 5 years. In September 2023, the company announced simultaneously the resignation of Omer Meir Wellber as its music director on 31 December 2023, and the appointment of Ben Glassberg as its new music director effective 1 January 2024. In June 2024, the company announced the extension of de Beer's contract to 2032.

== Facts and figures ==
=== Seating ===
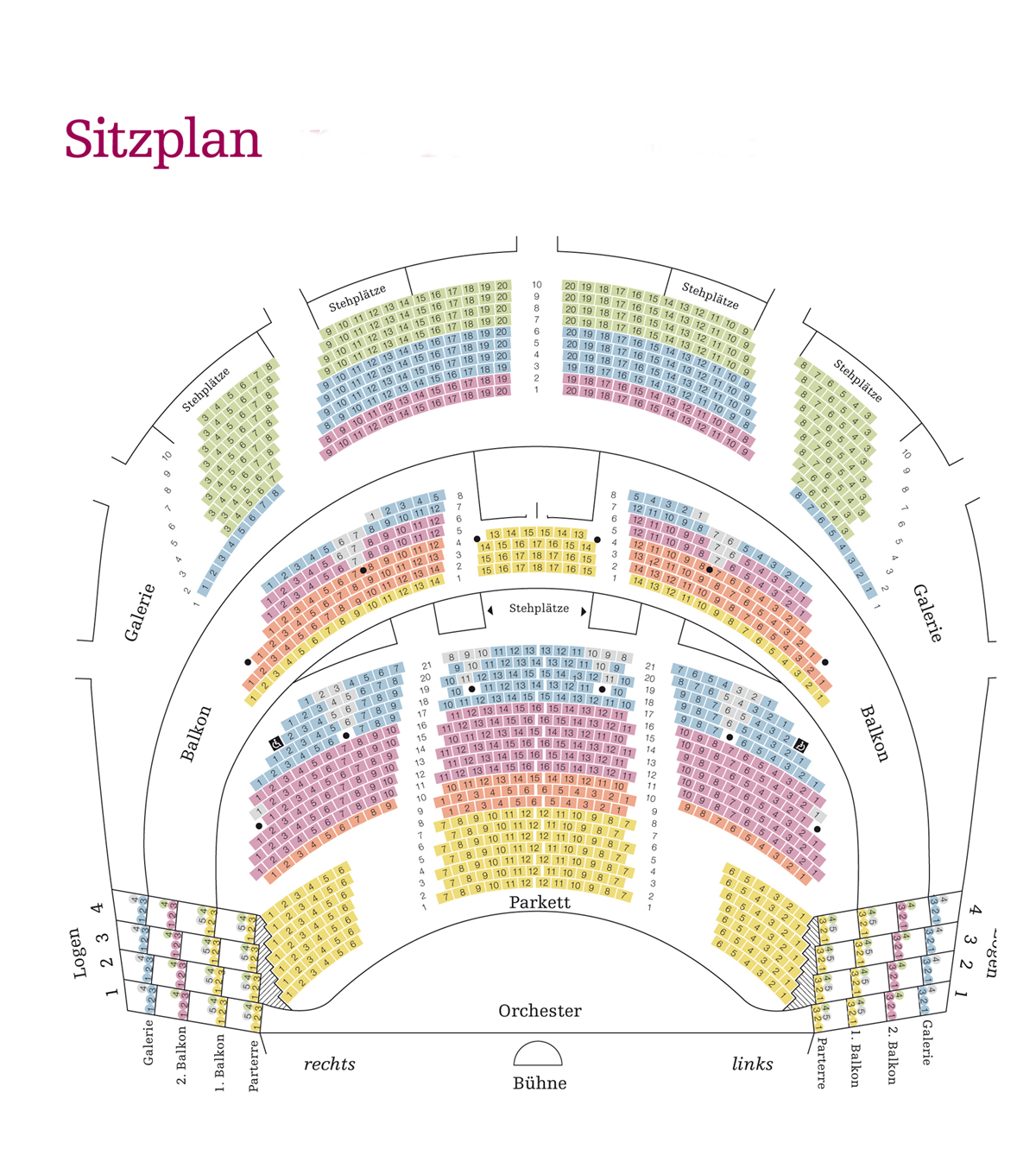
seating plan

On three different levels there are 1261 seats and 72 standing room places as well as two places for wheelchairs.

=== Number of performances by year ===
Season	Performances	spectators	avg. utilisation	avg. employees
2004/2005	287	293,695	75,41%	unknown
2005/2006	276	280,520	74,77%	524
2006/2007	281	289,721	78,34%	523
2007/2008	291	325,491	85,77%	526

=== Technical data ===
The orchestra pit is equipped with two electrically driven stage lifts, with a loading capacity of 500 kg/m^{2}. It is adjustable in height from 0 to 2.65 meters below stage level.

The red velvet house curtain is hydraulically drawn and liftable. The gather velocity is 0.15 to 3.0 m/s, the lift velocity can be up to 2.0 m/s.

The stage is 17.2 meters wide and 19 meters deep and has a mechanic load capacity of 500 kg/m^{2}. In the middle of the stage is a turnable and liftable circular platform, around which is a turnable ring platform with an external diameter of 15 meters. There are also 3 hand-operated person trap mechanisms.

=== Organisational structure ===
Since 1999 the Volksoper Vienna is a 100% subsidiary of the Bundestheater Holding AG (Federal theater holding AG) along with the Vienna State Opera and the Burgtheater (en: (Imperial) Court Theatre). The Bundestheater Holding AG is owned by the Republic of Austria. The Holding also holds 51.1% of the Theaterservice Gmbh, which offers services in design and administrational matters. The remaining 48.9% are shared equally among the three theater houses (16.3% each).

== Artistic directors ==
- Adam Müller-Guttenbrunn (1898–1903)
- Rainer Simons (1903–1917)
- Raoul Mader (1917–1919)
- Felix Weingartner (1919–1924)
- August Markowsky, Fritz Stiedry (1924)
- Hugo Gruder-Guntram, Leo Blech (1925)
- Hermann Frischler (1925–1928)
- Jakob Feldhammer, Otto Preminger (1929–1931)
- Leo Kraus (1931–1933)
- Karl Lustig-Prean, Jean Ernest (1934–1935)
- Alexander Kowalewsky (1935–1938)
- Anton Baumann (1938–1941)
- Oskar Joelli (1941–1944)
- Hermann Juch (1946–1955)
- Franz Salmhofer (1955–1963)
- Albert Moser (1963–1973)
- Karl Dönch (1973–1986)
- Eberhard Waechter (1987–1992)
- Ioan Holender (1992–1996)
- Klaus Bachler (1996–1999)
- Dominique Mentha (1999–2003)
- Rudolf Berger (2003–2007)
- Robert Meyer (2007–2022)
- Lotte de Beer (2022–present)
