= Drakhjärta =

- Directed by: Linda-Maria Birbeck; Klas Karterud
- Screenplay by: Anna Ehring
- Starring: Julius Grawin; Bill Hugg; Chatarina Larsson; Magnus Schmitz; Malte Legros Selander
- Release date: 1 November 2016
- Running time: 78 minutes
- Country: Sweden
- Language: Swedish
- Budget: 10,000,000kr

Drakhjärta is a Swedish family drama film released in 2016.

== Storyline ==
Nisse Berg is eleven years old and lives a "life of bad luck." His mother Sara is no longer alive. Before she died, she gave Nisse a lizard resembling an old, grumpy man, which Nisse names Harry. One day, Harry starts talking. He claims to be a dragon, with a dragon heart, and wonders if Nisse wants one too. Drakhjärta is about trying to accept life as it is, being yourself, growing up, and changing while the rest of the world keeps going, despite the horrible things that have happened.

== Characters ==
- Julius Grawin as Tage
- Bill Hugg as Grandfather
- Chatarina Larsson as Grandmother
- Magnus Schmitz as Dad
- Malte Legros Selander as Nisse

== Reception ==
The film has received eight out of ten stars from IMDb based on six reviews as of January 2020.

== See also ==
- Lists of Swedish films
- List of Swedish films of the 2010s
