= Linda-Maria Birbeck =

Swedish photographer (born 1974)

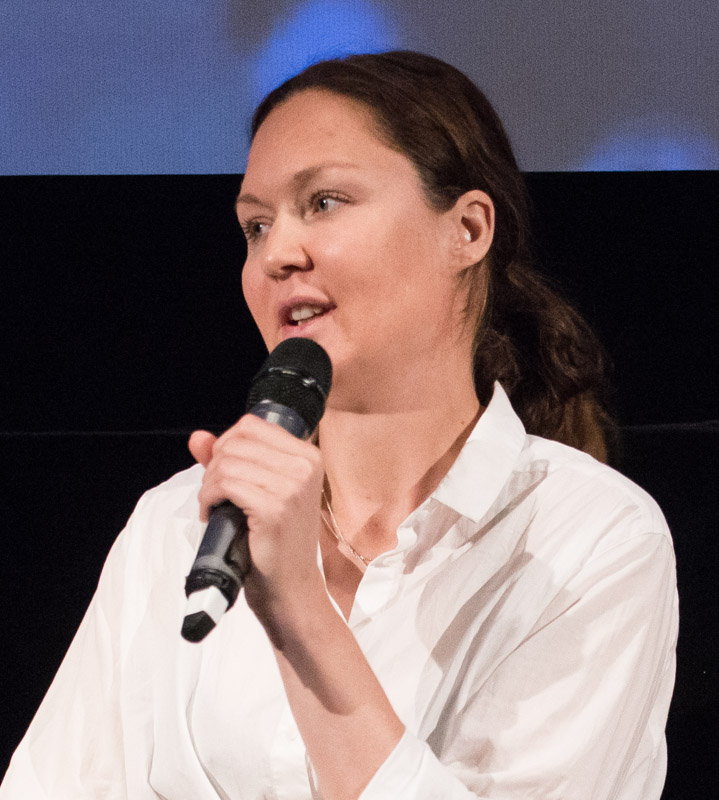
- Birbeck in 2015
- Born: 25 December 1974 (age 50); Karlstad, Sweden
- Occupations: Director; screenwriter; cinematographer; photographer

Linda-Maria Birbeck (born 25 December 1974) is a Swedish director, screenwriter, cinematographer and photographer.

== Career ==
Birbeck studied film and photography at Amsterdam University of the Arts in the Netherlands. Upon graduation she began working on film and television sets across northern Europe. Birbeck started her career mainly as a Documentary film maker and photographer. Around 2008 she began writing screenplays her first major work was titled Zorro. continued writing screenplays and got into directing around 2011. She directed her first Swedish language feature film Som en Zorro in 2012. The film received positive attention in Sweden and won a best film audience voted award at the 2012 Gothenburg Film Festival. In 2013 she was the head cinematographer for Shed No Tears. In 2015 Birbeck wrote and directed two Swedish language films Hitta Bort and Det borde finnas regler.

In 2016 Birbeck directed Drakhjärta which led to a popular Nordic television show by the same name.

== Filmography ==
Linda-Maria Birbeck filmography
Year	Work	Role		
Year	Work	Director	Writer	Camera
2012	Som en Zorro	Yes		
2013	Shed No Tears			Yes
2015	Hitta Bort	Yes	Yes	
2015	Det borde finnas regler	Yes	Yes	
2016	Drakhjärta	Yes		
2016–	Drakhjärta (TV)	Yes		

== Awards and nominations ==
Year	Award	Work	Result	Refs
2012	Göteborg Film Festival Audience Award	Som en Zorro	Won	
2015	Nordic International Film Festival Best Feature Film	Det borde finnas regler	Won	
2015	Woodstock Film Festival Best Female Director		Won	
