= Academy of Architecture (Amsterdam) =

Unit of Amsterdam University of the Arts

Academy of Architecture Amsterdam
- Academie van Bouwkunst
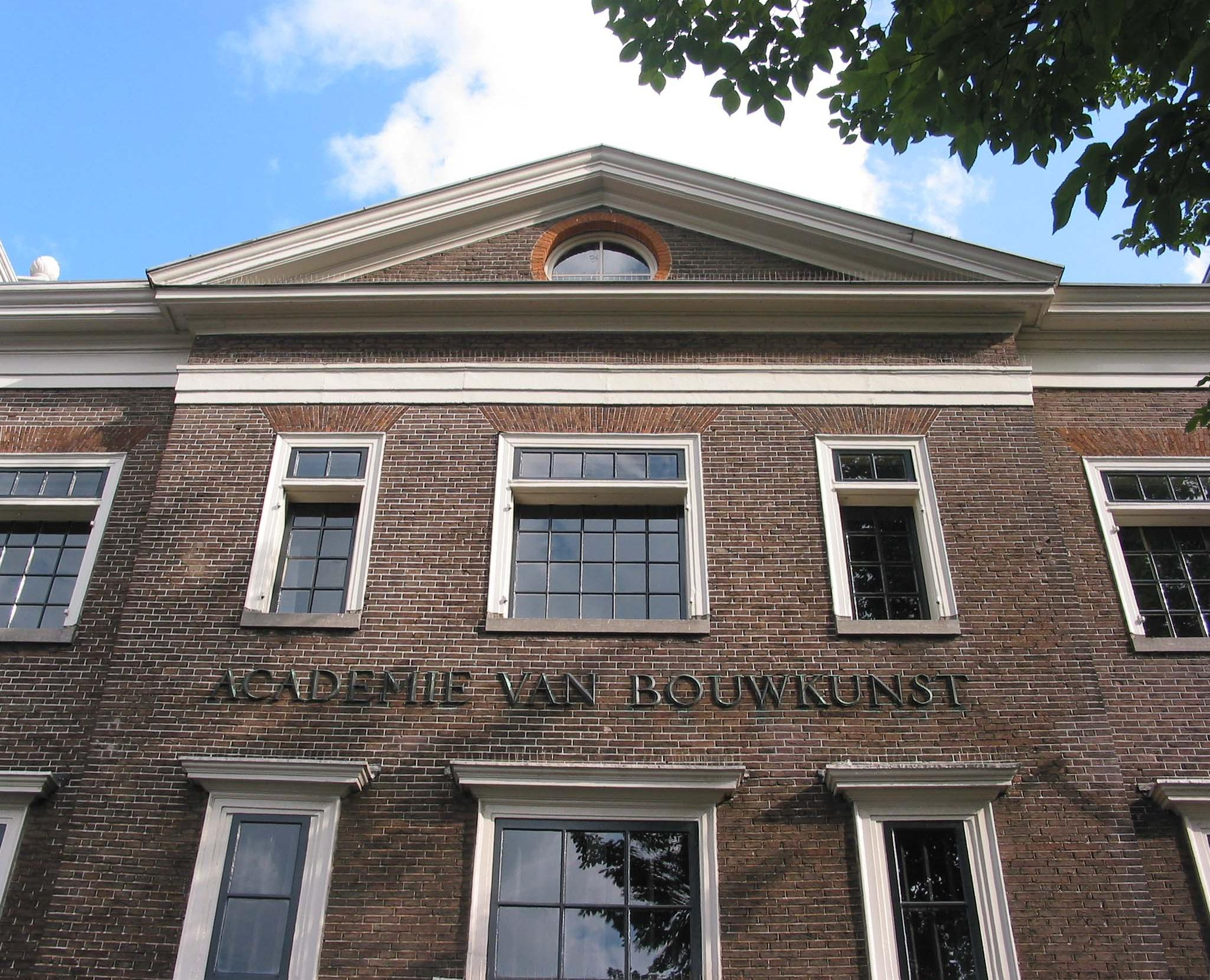
- Established: 1908
- Parent institution: Amsterdamse Hogeschool voor de Kunsten
- Director: Madeleine Maaskant
- Location: Waterlooplein 211-213, Amsterdam, the Netherlands
- Website: https://www.bouwkunst.ahk.nl/

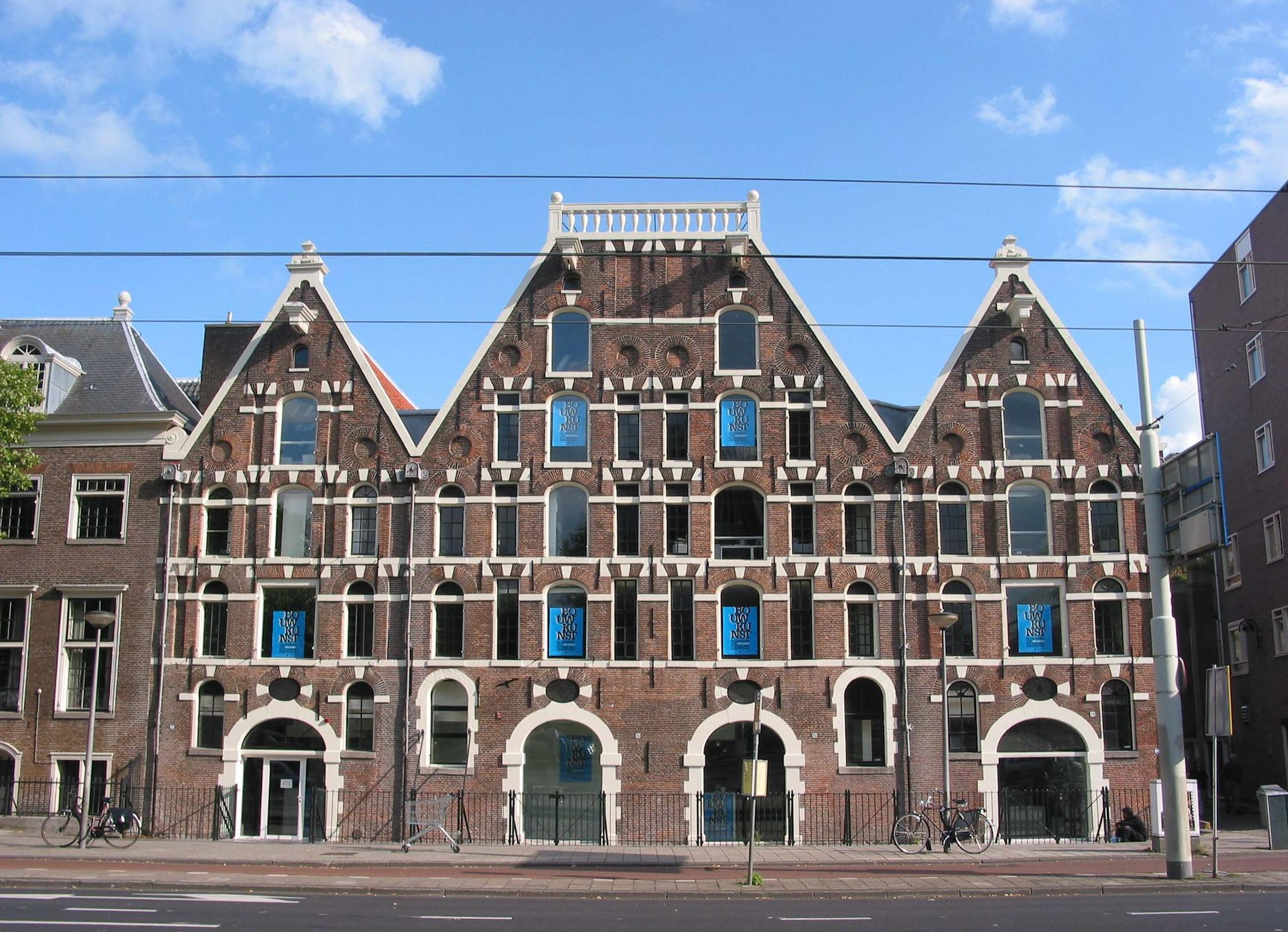
Former warehouse Het Arsenaal, Waterlooplein 213, Amsterdam

The Academy of Architecture of Amsterdam (Dutch: Academie van Bouwkunst Amsterdam) is a Dutch postgraduate school in architecture located in Amsterdam. This school is the architecture division of the Amsterdam University of the Arts, the city's vocational university of arts. The postgraduate school exists next to the technical universities that offer both undergraduate and graduate programs in architecture. The Academy of Architecture is the largest architectural postgraduate school in the Netherlands, offering interdisciplinary programs in architecture, urban design, and landscape architecture. Making it the only school in the Netherlands that offers these three programs interdisciplinary.

== History ==
In 1908 the Academy of Architecture Amsterdam was set up by prominent members of the association Architectura et Amicitia as a department of the Rijksakademie van beeldende kunsten. At that time Amsterdam had been lacking an architecture school for 40 years already, after the architecture department of Koninklijke Academie van Beeldende Kunsten had been moved to the Polytechnic School of Delft (now known as Delft University of Technology) in 1870.

The goal of the Academy of Architecture coincided with that of Architecture et Amicitia and as of 2020 has not been changed: new generations of practitioners passing on their professional knowledge to ever newer generations . The teachers at the Academy are practising designers; this unifies theory and practice. This union is strengthened by the requirement that students work in the field during their studies.

so the curriculum was created by both Willem Kromhout of Architectura et Amicitia and the director of the Rijksakademie, Antoon Derkinderen. Thus at the conception of the academy, education in urban design was already provided. At that time this was a relatively new discipline, and the curriculum was unique at that time.

The goal of the Academy of Architecture coincided with that of Architectura et Amicitia and has not been changed ever since: educating each other in architecture. The teachers, who generally were also members of A et A, were practising architects and only students with practical experience were admitted. This created an amalgamation of theory and practice. The first educational programme was composed by Willem Kromhout and Antoon Derkinderen, the director of the Rijksacademie van Beeldende Kunsten.

== Education ==
The Academy of Architecture in Amsterdam is the only educational institute in the Netherlands that offers master education in architecture, urban design and landscape architecture in an interdisciplinary setting. The curriculum of the master education consists of school education and education in practice. The practical experience is done in parttime with the design education in school. Because of this dual programme graduates have fulfilled the necessary experience in practice to become a chartered architect in the Netherlands.

== Notable alumni ==
- Alphons Boosten
- Piet Blom
- Jan van der Jagt
- Jaap Bakema
- Anne Holtrop
- Margaret Staal-Kropholler
- Friedrich Silaban

=== Current ===
- Machiel Spaan

=== Emeritus ===
- Pierre Cuypers
- Hendrik Petrus Berlage
- Karel de Bazel
- Jan Duiker
- Frits Peutz
- J.J.P. Oud
- Leendert van der Vlugt
- Cornelis van Eesteren
- Gerrit Rietveld
- Ad van der Steur
- Marinus Jan Granpré Molière
- Willem Marinus Dudok
- Mart Stam
- Aldo van Eyck

== Sources ==
- Dave Wendt (2008) 'Academie van Bouwkunst 1908-2008', Uitgeverij 010, Rotterdam
- Jeroen Schilt, Jouke van der Werf (1992) Genootschap Architectura et Amicitia. Rotterdam: Uitgeverij 010 (ISBN 906450105X), pp. 94, 96, 98, 100, 104.
- de Jong, K.J.; Academie van Bouwkunst Amsterdam (2010). Re-inventing the Academy: The First Century of the Amsterdam Academy of Architecture 1908-2008. Research - reflections - projects. The Academy. ISBN 978-94-6140-008-6.
- Ozawa, Takeo (2013). "Architectural Education at the Academy of Architecture, Amsterdam NL Investigation of Architectural Education in the Netherlands - Part I". Journal of Asian Architecture and Building Engineering. 12 (2): 165–172. doi:10.3130/jaabe.12.165. ISSN 1346-7581.
