= Stopera =

Complex with city hall and opera in Amsterdam

Coordinates: 52°22′02″N 4°54′06″E

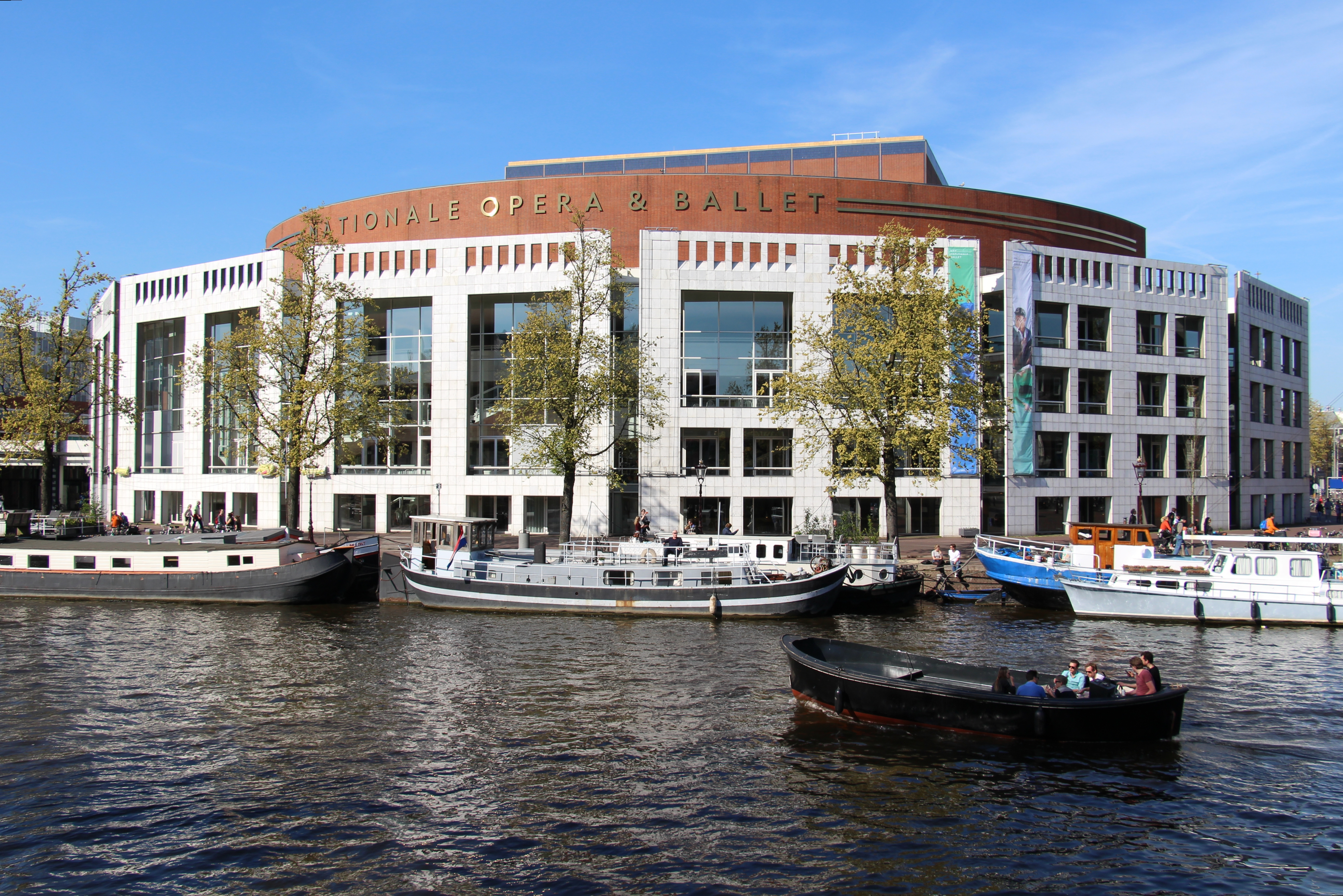
- The Stopera
- Interactive map of the Stopera area

General information
- Location: Amstel 1, 1011 PN Amsterdam, the Netherlands
- Current tenants: Government of Amsterdam, Dutch National Opera, Dutch National Ballet and Holland Symfonia
- Completed: September 1986; 40 years ago
- Client: Government of Amsterdam

Design and construction
- Architects: Bernard Bijvoet & Gerard Holt, Wilhelm Holzbauer and Cees Dam

The Stopera is a building complex in Amsterdam, Netherlands, housing both the city hall of Amsterdam and the Dutch National Opera and Ballet (formerly Het Muziektheater), the principal opera house in Amsterdam that is home of Dutch National Opera, Dutch National Ballet and Holland Symfonia. The building was designed by Wilhelm Holzbauer and Cees Dam.

The name is portmanteau of "st"adhuis (Dutch: "city hall") and "opera" the word 'Stopera' having been a name for the protests against the building.

The Stopera is located in the center of Amsterdam at a bend of the Amstel River between Waterlooplein Square and the Zwanenburgwal Canal, on a plot of land called Vlooienburg, which was reclaimed in the early 17th century. The opera house building is shaped like a massive block, with a curved front facing the Amstel river. Its facade is covered in a red-orange brick and corrugated metal panels. The curved face of the theatre is faced with white marble punctuated by large windows that provide panoramic views of the river from the curved interior foyers and multi-level terraces. The building complex also includes a grand café as well as underground public parking.

Next to the Stopera is the Joods Verzetsmonument, a 1988 monument to the Jewish victims of World War II. A remembrance of the Kristallnacht is held at the monument every year.

== History ==
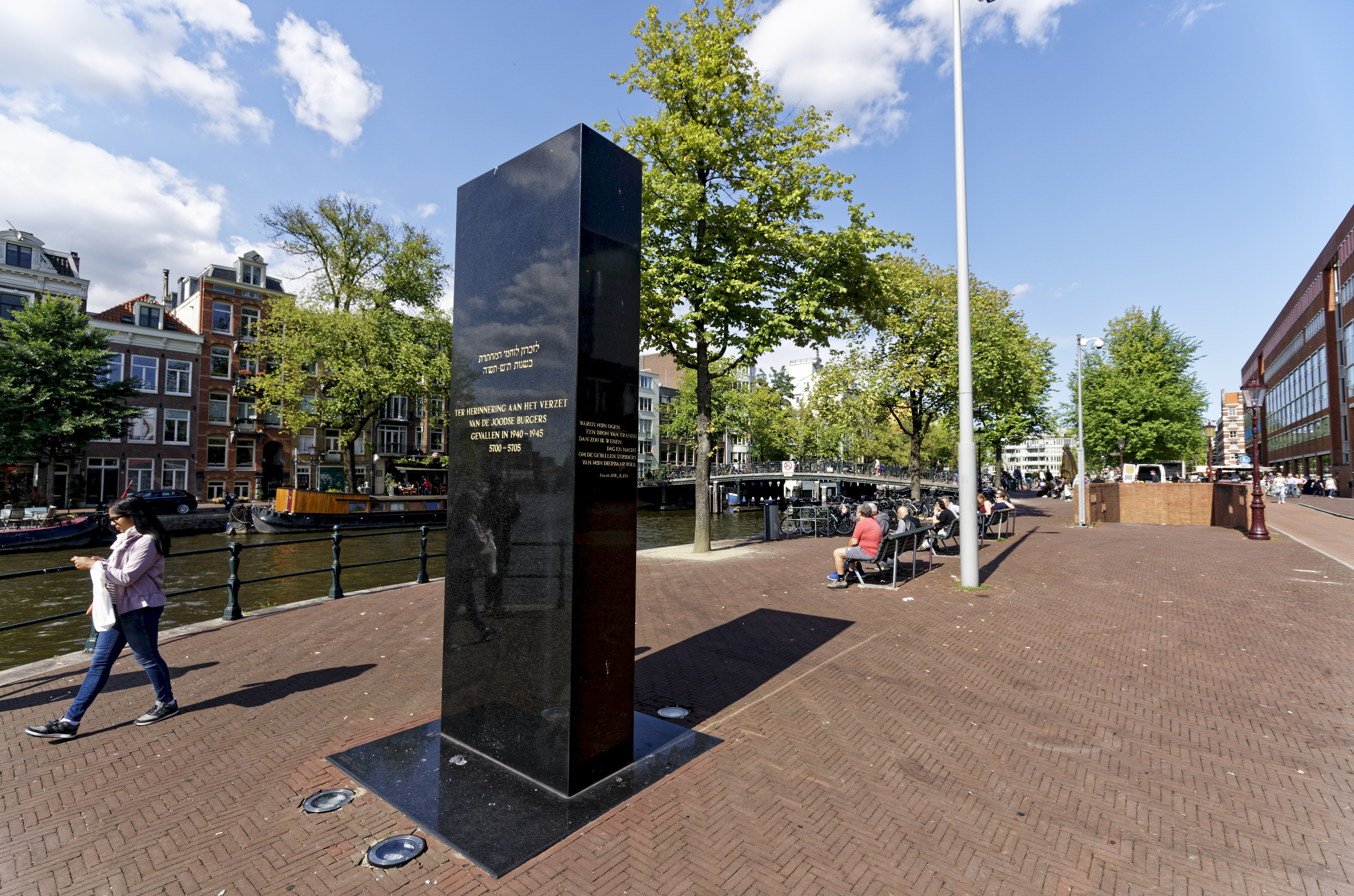
The Joods Verzetsmonument in remembrance of the Jewish victims of World War II

The construction of the Stopera was at least 60 years in the making. As early as 1915, discussions were held about building a new opera house as well as a new city hall. Various sites were considered for the new city hall, until they finally chose an expansive area of the Jewish district which had been largely abandoned during the late 1940s as its occupants were deported to concentration camps.

The Amsterdam city council established a commission in 1955 to create a design with the architectural firm of Berghoef and Vegter. After almost ten years, the council rejected their final proposal in 1964 and held a competition in 1967 for a new design. The council selected a design by Viennese architect Wilhelm Holzbauer. However, plans for the new city hall were delayed again by budget constraints, as were the opera house plans.

In 1979, it was proposed that the city hall and opera house should be combined into one complex. The opera and the Dutch National Ballet would have a shared performance space. In 1980 the Amsterdam city council approved the new design by Cees Dam and Wilhelm Holzbauer. Approval from the provincial and national governments followed in 1981.

The Stopera was a controversial project that met with heavy protests, particularly from the local counterculture and leftwing groups like the squatter movement and Provo movement, leading to riots when construction began in 1982. The project went seriously over budget and the final cost was 112 million Dutch guilders more than originally budgeted.

The opera officially opened on 23 September 1986; the new city hall opened two years later.
