= Margaret Staal-Kropholler =

Dutch architect

Margaret Kropholler
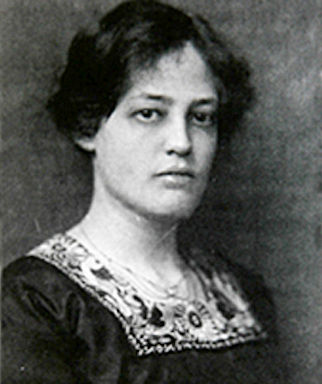
- Born: June 27, 1891; Haarlem
- Died: November 15, 1966 (aged 75); Amsterdam
- Education: Amsterdam Academy of Architecture
- Occupation: Architect
- Spouse: Jan Frederik Staal m. 1936, died 1940

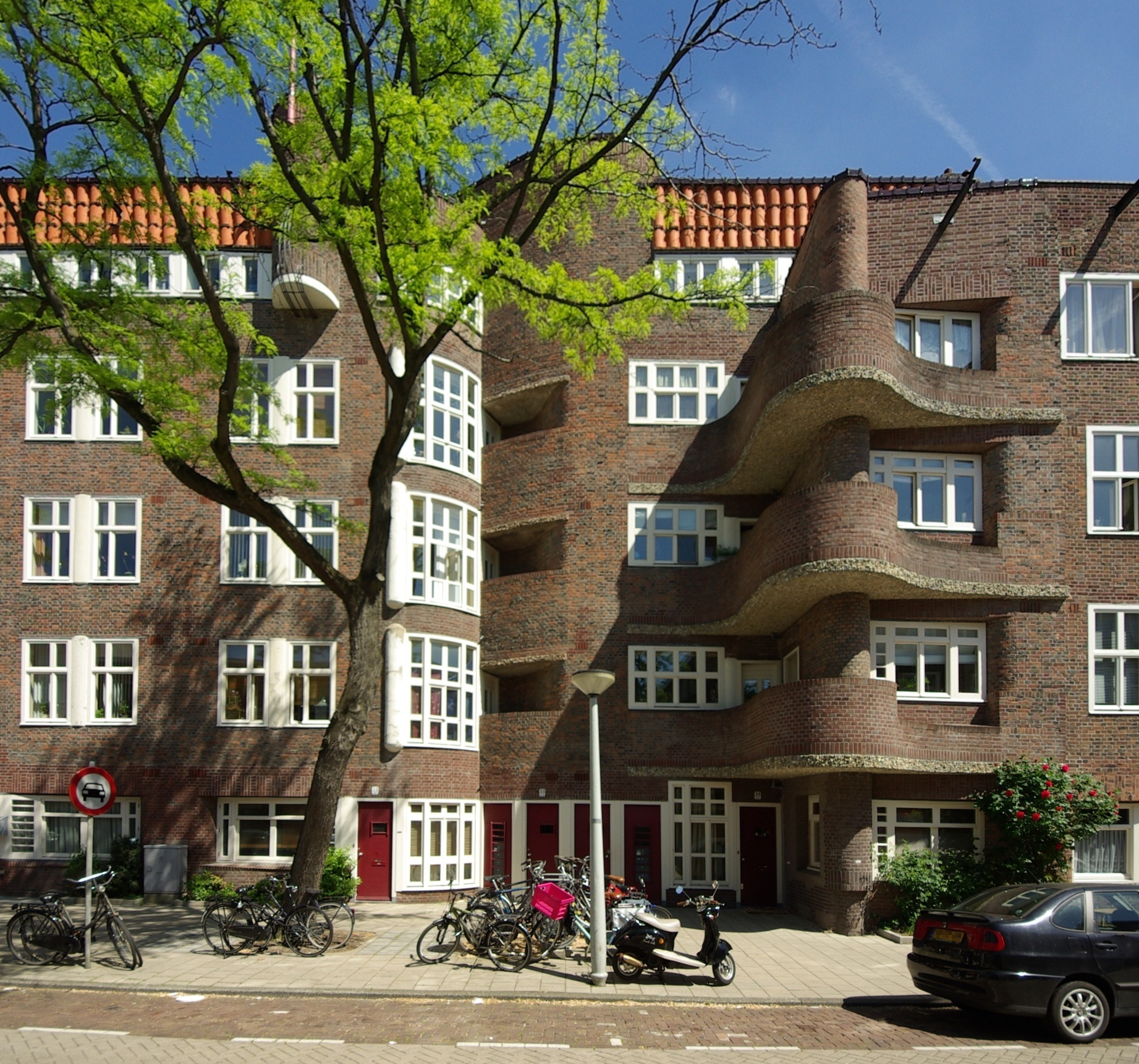
Margaret Staal-Kropholler: apartment building, Holendrechtstraat 1-47, Amsterdam (1923)

Margaret Staal-Kropholler, frequently referred to as Margaret Kropholler, (27 June 1891, Haarlem - 15 November 1966, Amsterdam) was the first woman in the Netherlands to practice as a professional architect.

== Biography ==
After completing her schooling in Amsterdam in 1907, she became a trainee with the architectural firm Kropholler en Staal where her brother Alexander Kropholler had set up a practice with Jan Frederik Staal. She then attended the arts and crafts school in Haarlem before taking evening classes at the Amsterdam Academy of Architecture (1914–1916). In 1910, Alexander Kropholler went off on his own while Margaret Kropholler continued to work with Staal whom she later married. Initially, she was mainly involved in the design of furniture, lamps and related objects but also had a few building assignments.

== Career ==
In 1913, when she was just 21, Kropholler received her first assignment, the interior decoration of Het Huis 1913 (The 1913 House) at the Amsterdam exhibition De Vrouw 1813–1913 (Woman 1813-1913). In 1915, she worked for six months for the Amsterdam Public Works Department. From 1916, in addition to continuing her work with J. F. Staal, she began to practice as an independent architect. In 1917, she was one of the five architects who participated in the construction of 16 houses with thatched roofs in the park district of Bergen based mainly on the use of tiles and terracotta elements. Even at that early stage, the four houses she designed clearly belonged to the Amsterdam School. The successful part she had played in the project was noticed by H. T. Wijdeveld who commented on the fine work a woman had, for the first time, executed in the field of architecture.

In subsequent years, Kropholler undertook further projects in the style of the Amsterdam School, receiving international recognition in 1925 when she was awarded a silver medal for her architectural work in the Dutch exhibit at the Paris Decorative Arts Exposition. In the late 1920s, her work took on a more Modernistic approach. In the 1930s, she collaborated with her husband on a number of projects. Staal appreciated her involvement, deeming her work artistically and technically excellent, especially the interiors she designed for the Beurs-World Trade Center in Rotterdam, completed in 1940.

In the post-war years, Kropholler submitted a number of proposals for housing reconstruction which were turned down as a result of new criteria defining maximum volumes and floor space. By contrast, she was successful in receiving over 40 interior design commissions for store renovations. Thereafter, her architectural work was mainly limited to surveys and lectures, allowing her to remain active into the 1960s.

== Concern with housing design ==
As both a housewife and an architect, Margaret Kropholler was conscious of the need to reduce the amount of effort women needed to put into domestic chores. By designing comfortable, well-equipped housing, based on functional plans, she could make it easier for women to run their homes. From 1918, when she made a presentation to the Dutch Association for Housewives on "The Women and her House", she frequently presented her ideas on functional requirements for the housewife in lectures and journal articles.

== Key works ==
- Housing in Holendrechtstraat, Amsterdam: Together with other architects, Kropholler was commissioned in 1921 to design housing blocks in the south of Amsterdam where she adopted the style of the Amsterdam School in several four-storey buildings with symmetrical facades and projecting balconies.
- Louise Went House, Amsterdam: In 1959, as a result of an initiative by Louise van der Pek-Went for singles housing, Kropholler was commissioned to build a block consisting of a central section with a staircase and two wings containing 170 units with kitchen, toilet and bathroom as well as 11 guest rooms. It was completed in 1963.

== Literature ==
- Augusteijn, M., Kuijvenhoven, W. From a practical point of view, (2013) Documentary
- Kessel, E. van, Kuperus, M.: Margaret Staal-Kropholler, Architect 1891-1966, Rotterdam 1991, 96 pp. ISBN 90-6450-106-8 (in Dutch)
- Loeff-Bokma, A.H., Margaret Kropholler, in De vrouw en haar huis, (1929)8, 399-405. (in Dutch)
- Oomen, F., Margaret Staal-Kropholler, in: N. Hermes, Intra Muros, twaalf Nederlandse interieurarchitectes van deze eeuw, Amsterdam 1992, 18-23. (in Dutch)
- Staal-Kropholler, M., 'Huisvesting van het onmaatschappelijk gezin', Bouw, (1953)51,992. (in Dutch)
- Staal-Kropholler, M., Onze woning-enquête, De Huisvrouw, 31(1947)1,5. (in Dutch)
- Verkruijsen, H.C., Landhuizen, in De Vrouw en haar huis, (1918)6,164-168. (in Dutch)
- Wijdeveld, H.Th., Het Park Meerwijk te Bergen, Wendingen, 1(1918)8,4-12. (in Dutch)
