= Amsterdam University of the Arts =

Dutch professional higher education institute

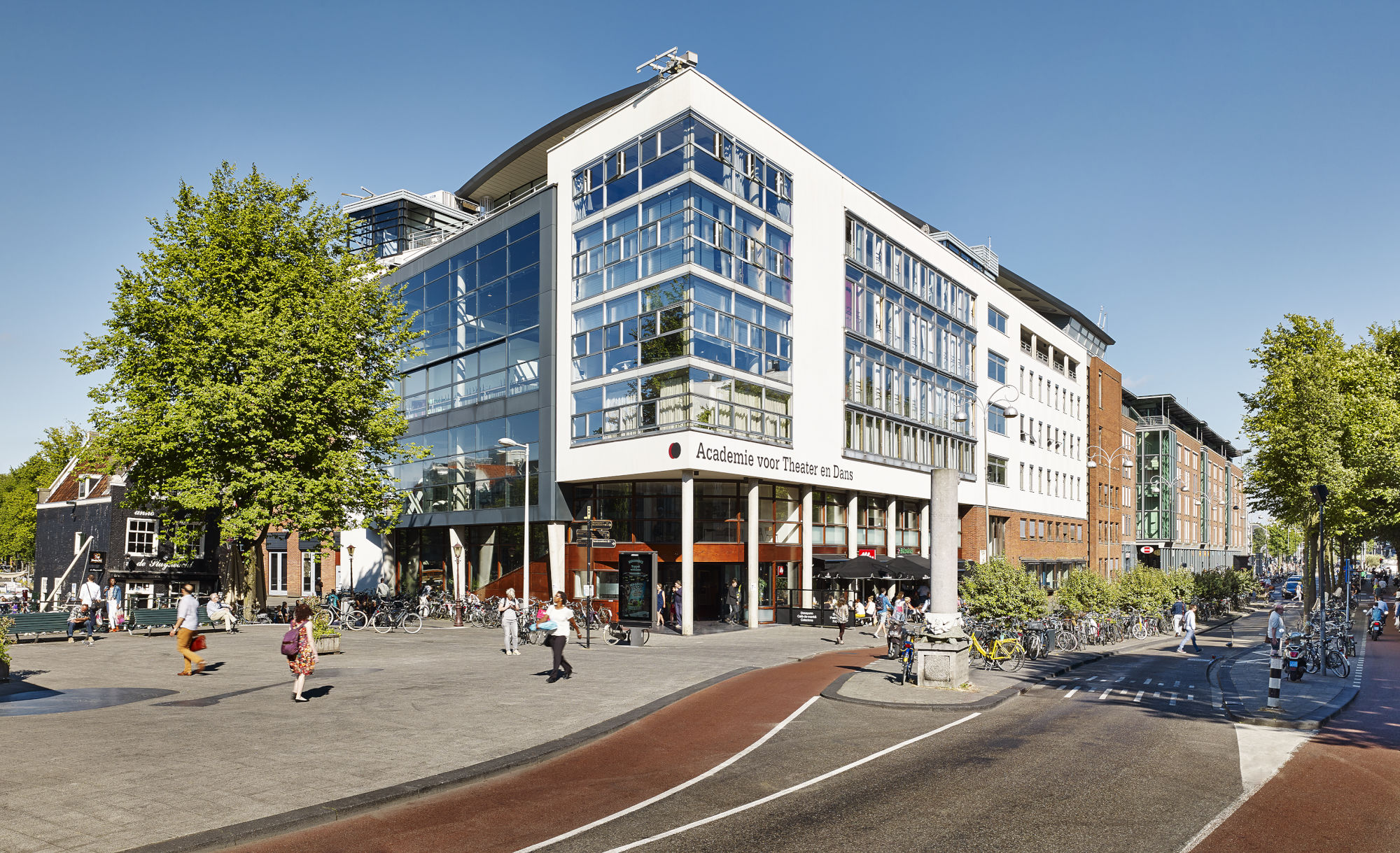
- Amsterdam University of the Arts location in the city centre
- Type: Art school
- Established: 1987 (merged)
- Students: 3.300
- Location: Amsterdam, Netherlands
- Campus: Urban
- Website: ahk.nl/en

The Amsterdam University of the Arts (Dutch: Amsterdamse Hogeschool voor de Kunsten) is a Dutch institute for higher professional education located in Amsterdam.

The university consists of:

- Academy of Architecture
- Academy of Theatre and Dance
- Breitner Academy – education in arts
- Conservatorium van Amsterdam – music academy
- Netherlands Film Academy
- Reinwardt Academy – museology studies

== Notable alumni ==
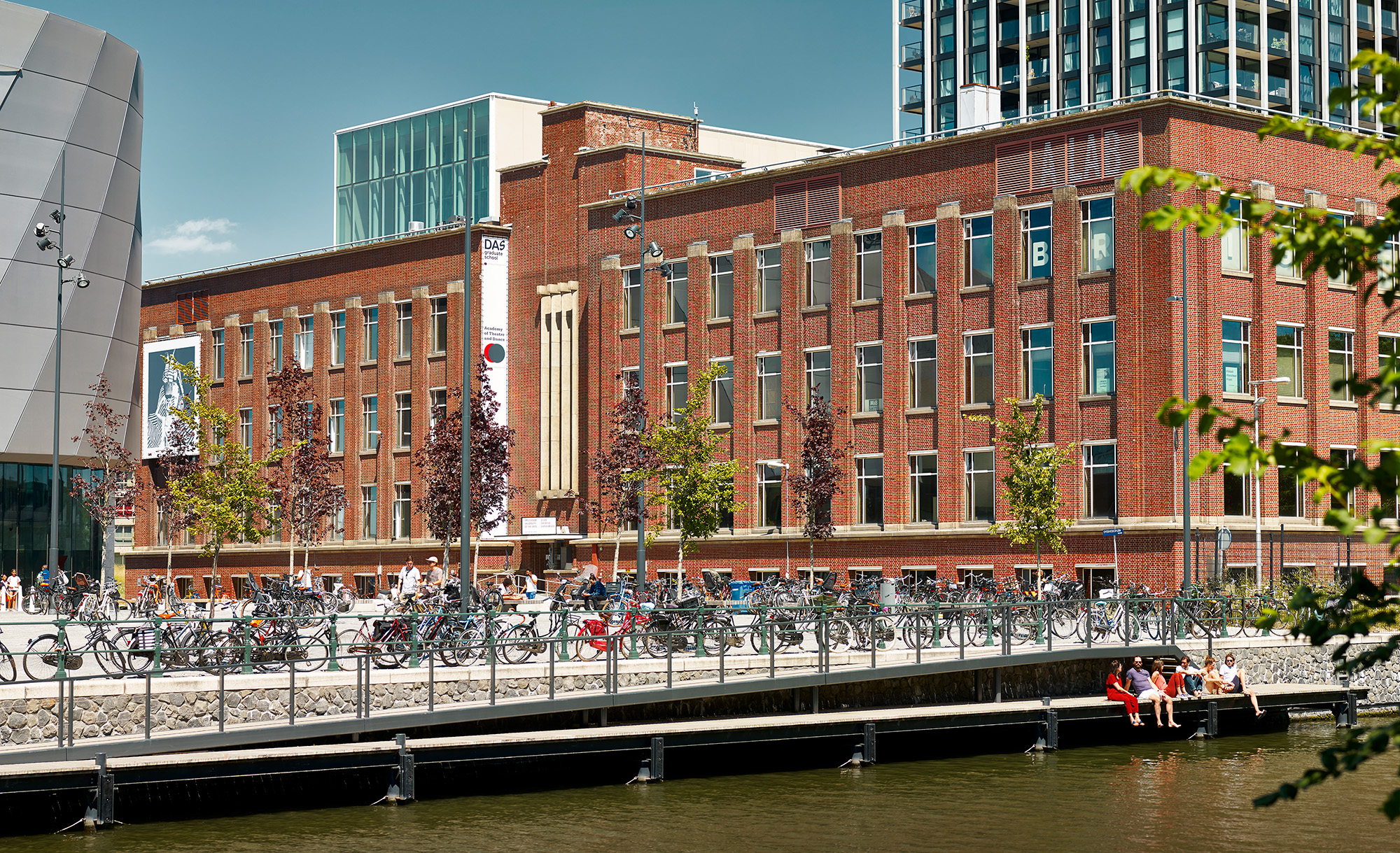
The Breitner Academy of the Amsterdam University of the Arts in Amsterdam-Noord

The following is a list of notable former students:

- Lotte de Beer – Dutch opera director
- Linda-Maria Birbeck – Swedish photographer
- Bojan Đorđev – Serbian theater director
- Anne Hartkamp – German singer
- Jens Hoffmann – Costa Rican writer and educator
- Florentina Holzinger – Austrian choreographer, director and performance artist
- Chantal Janzen – Dutch actress, singer and presenter
- Simone Kleinsma – actress
- Piet Zwart (1885–1977) – graphic designer, industrial designer and typographer
- Carice van Houten – actress
- Jeroen van Koningsbrugge – actor, comedian, presenter
- Mohammed Azaay – actor
- Tjitske Reidinga – actress, comedian
- Elise Schaap – actress
