= List of museums in Amsterdam =

This is a list of museums in the Dutch capital of Amsterdam:

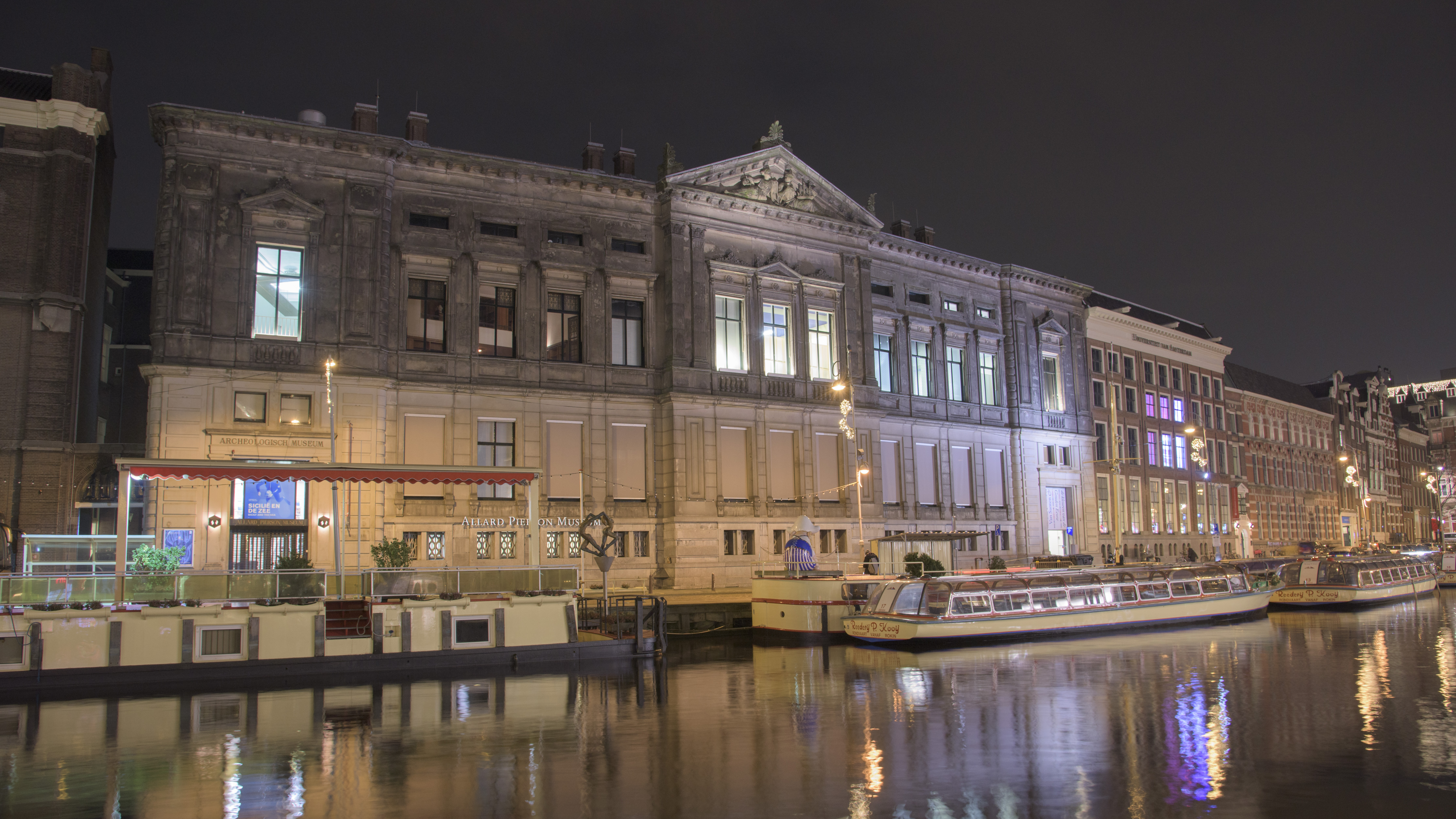
The Allard Pierson Museum

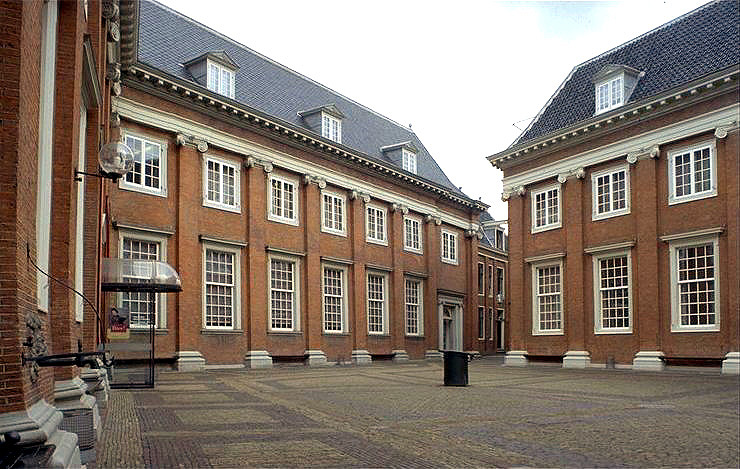
The Amsterdam Museum

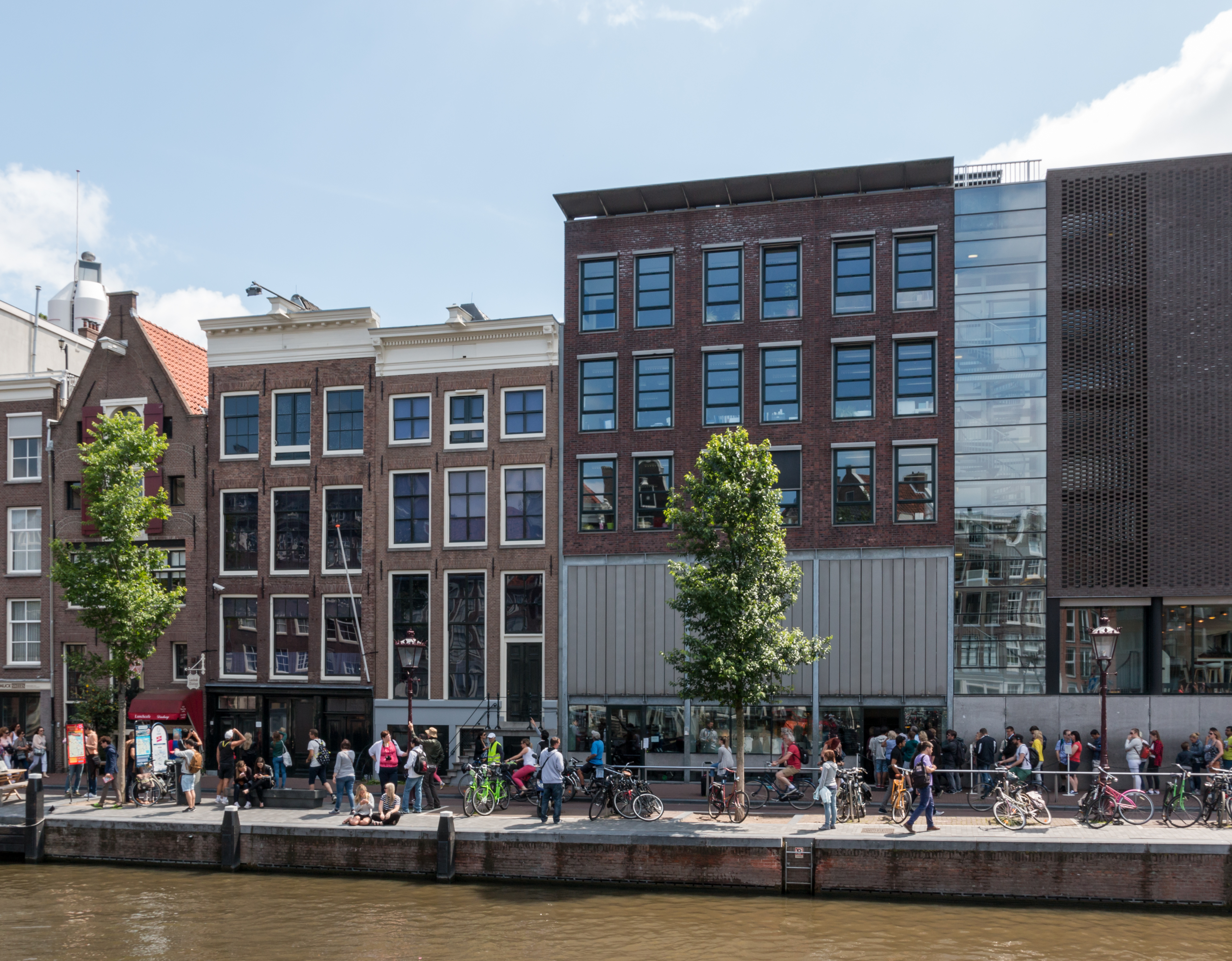
The Anne Frank House

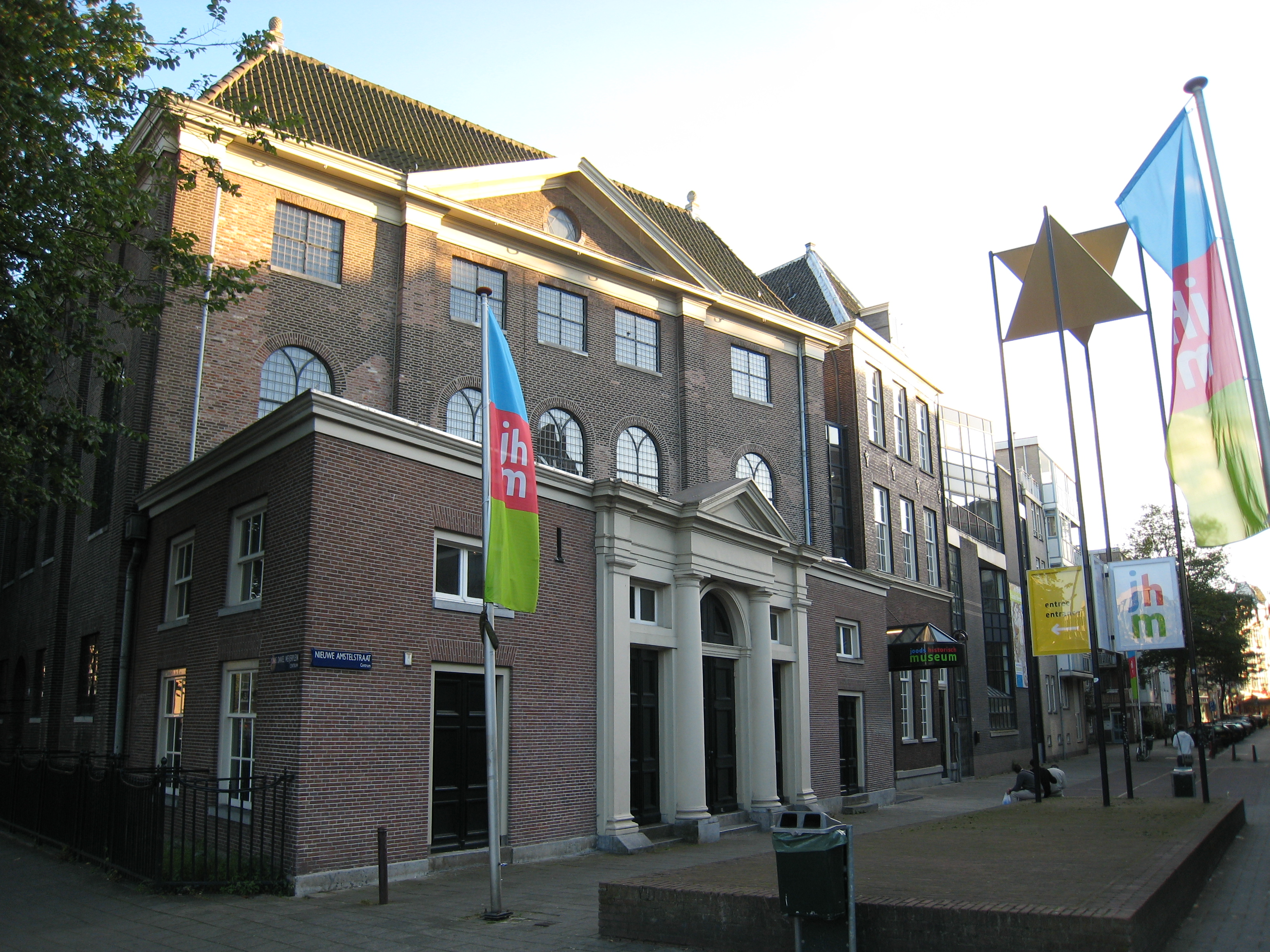
The Joods Historisch Museum

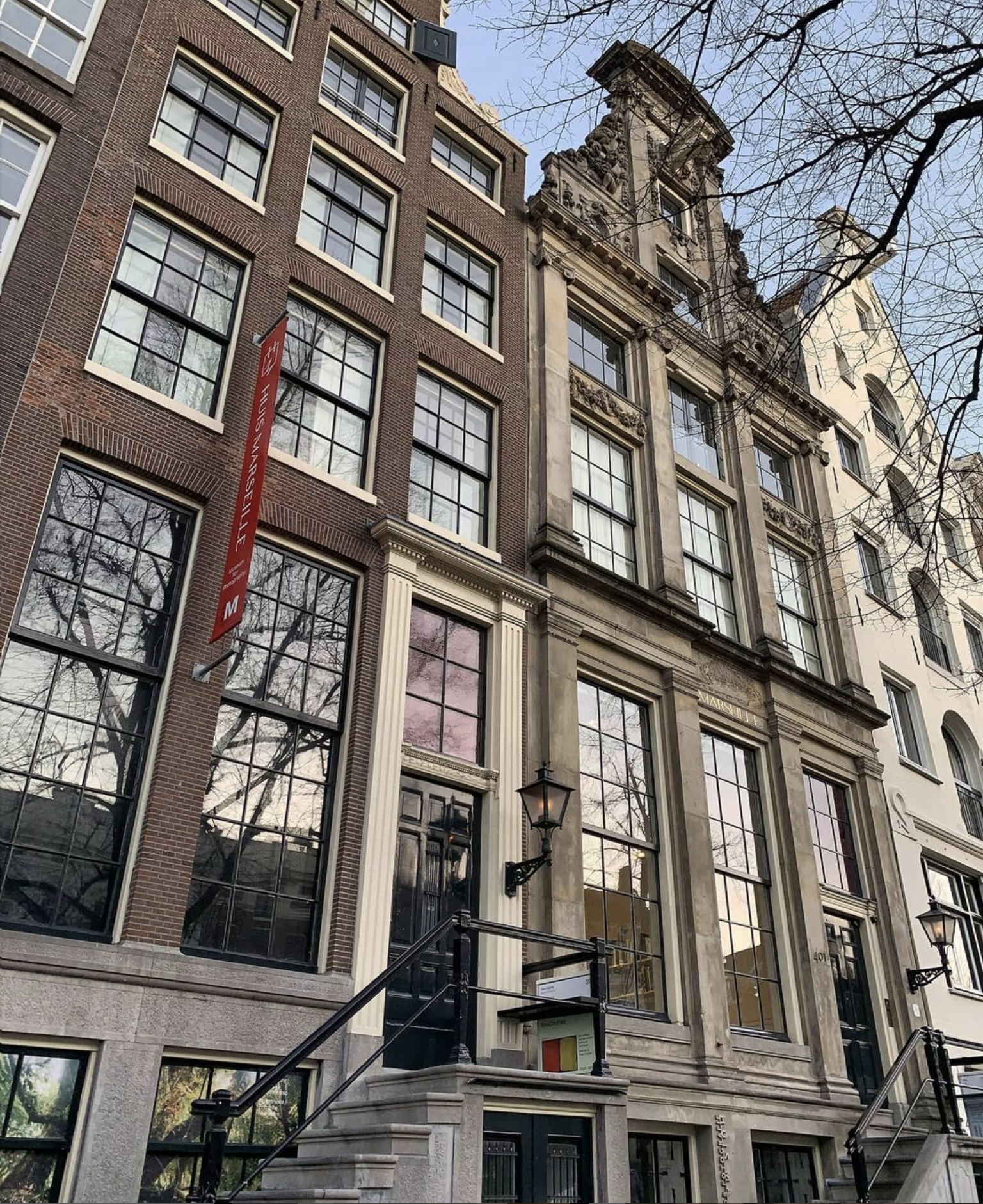
Huis Marseille, oldest photography museum in Amsterdam

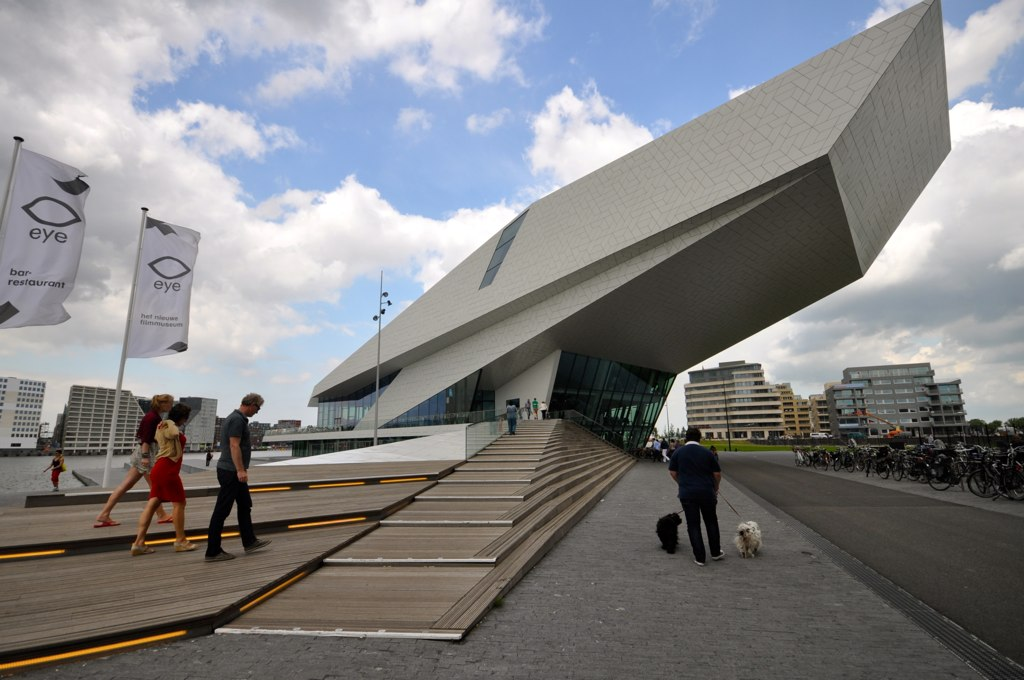
The Nederlands Filmmuseum

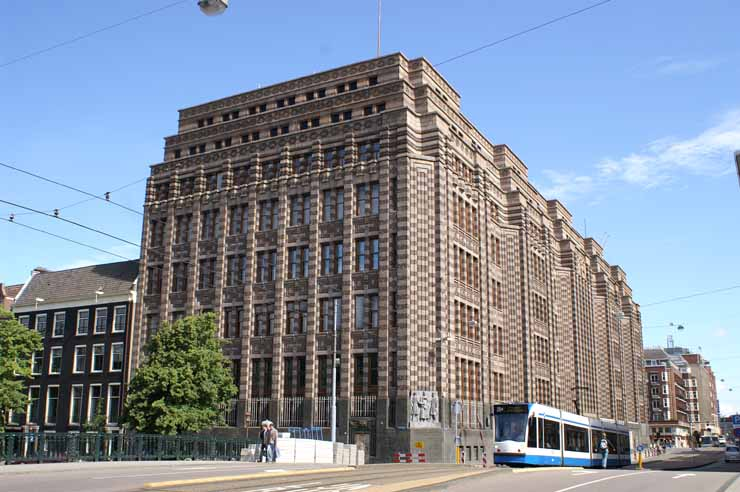
The Stadsarchief Amsterdam

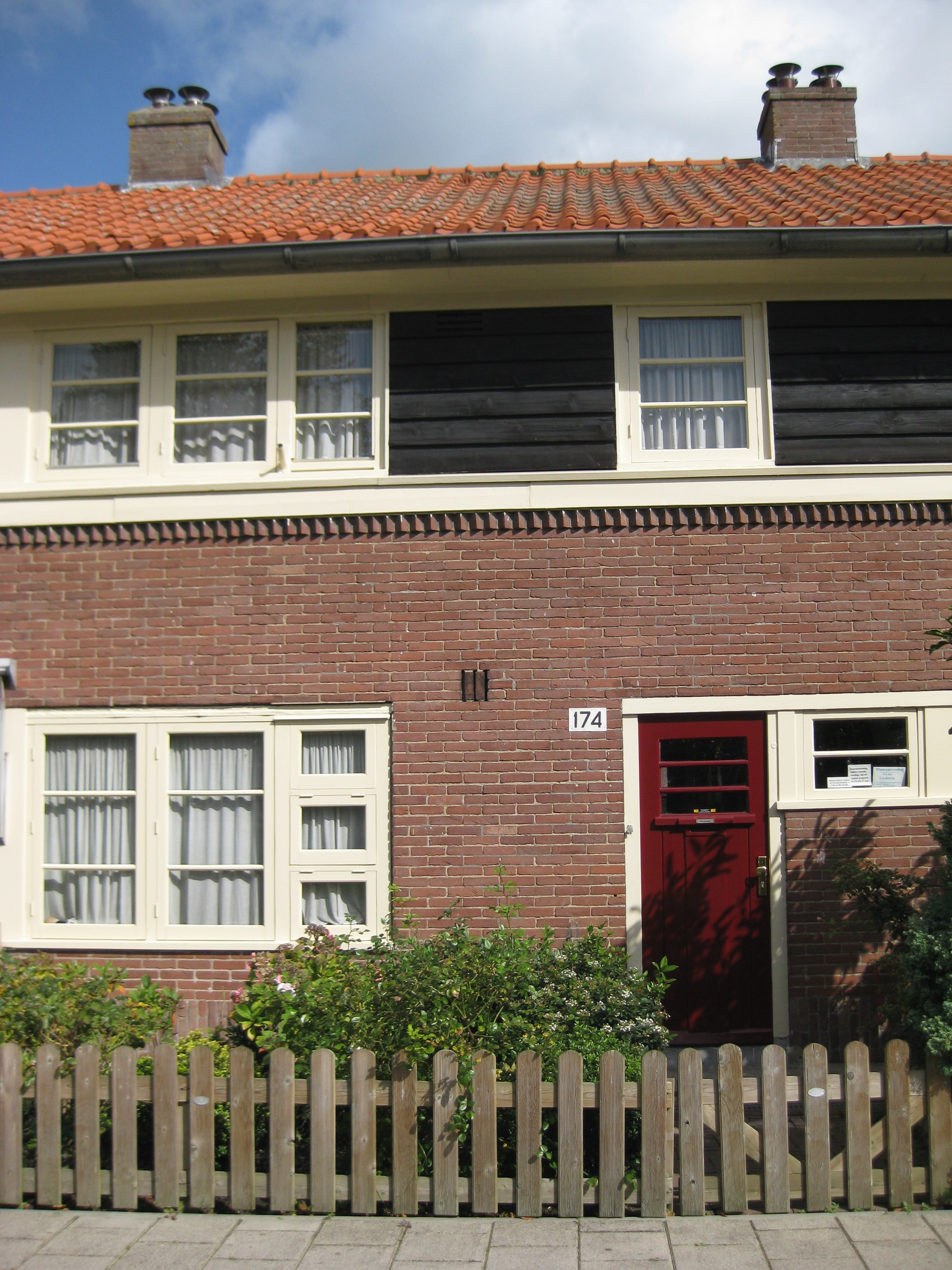
Museumwoning Tuindorp Oostzaan

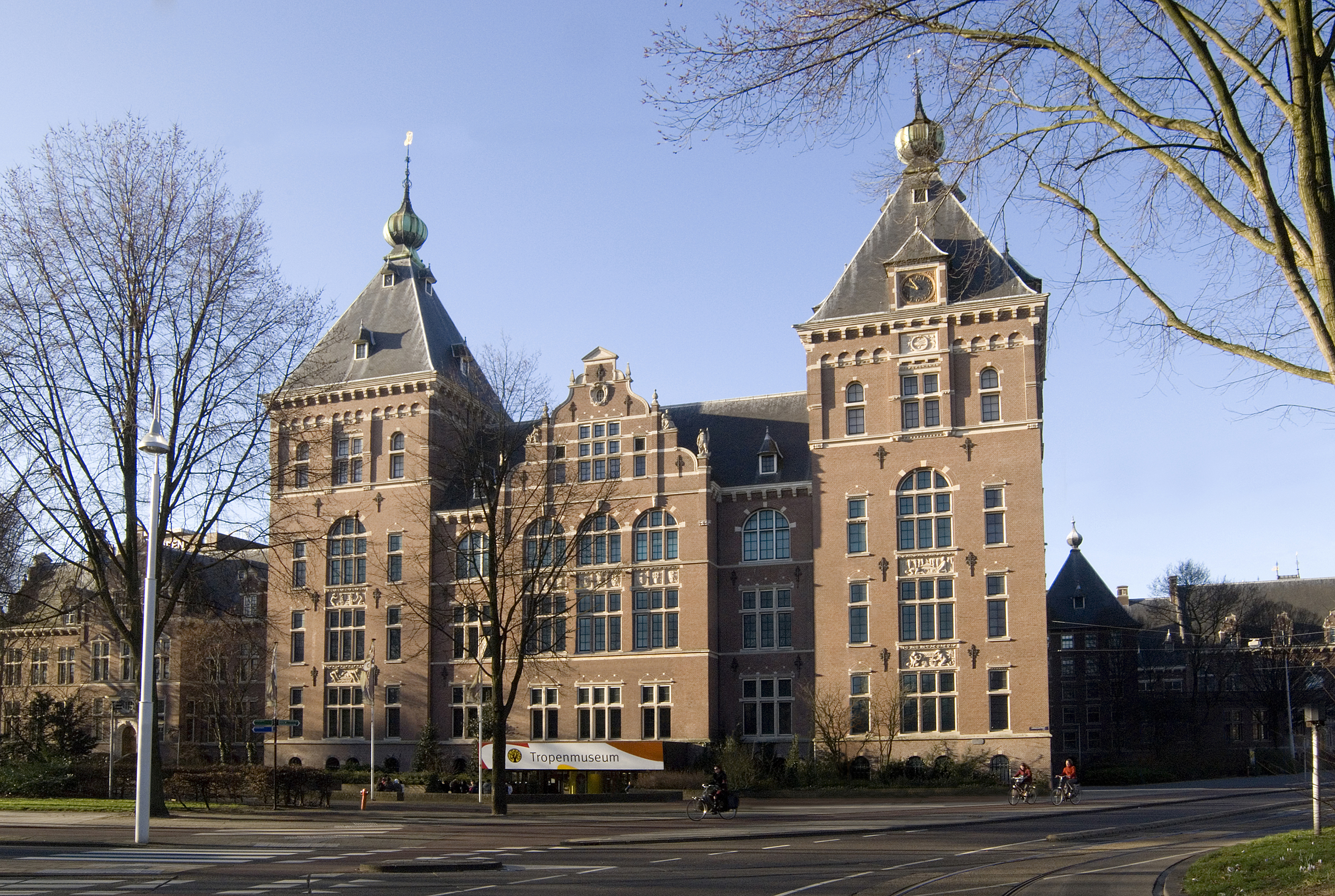
Wereldmuseum Amsterdam

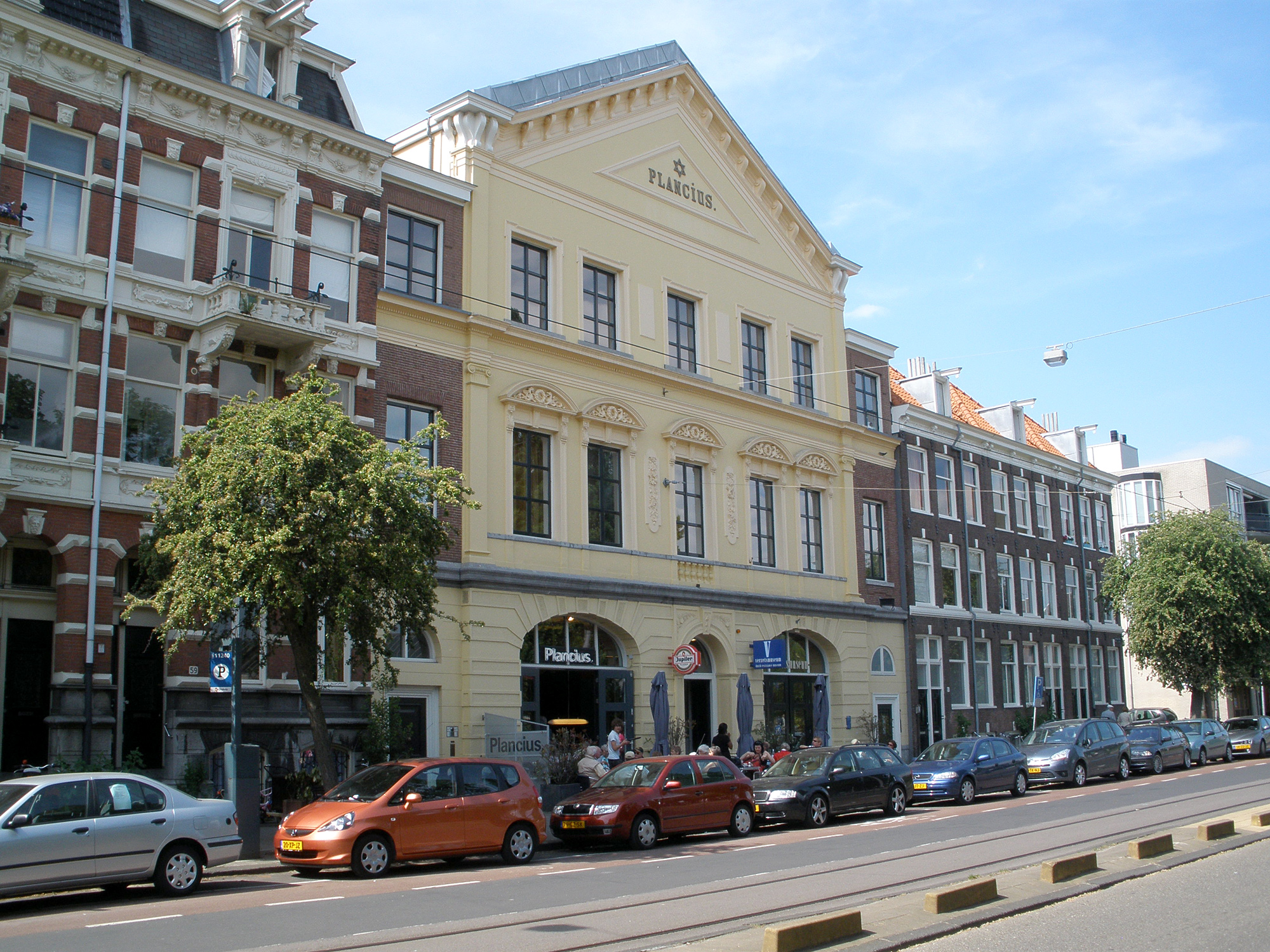
Verzetsmuseum

- Allard Pierson Museum, archeological museum of the University of Amsterdam, with special collections of the University Library
- Amsterdam Centre for Architecture (ARCAM)
- Amsterdam Dungeon
- Amsterdam Museum, formerly (up to 2011) Amsterdams Historisch Museum
- Amsterdam Tulip Museum
- Anne Frank House
- Appie Baantjer Museum, about author of detectives (visit by appointment)
- Beurs van Berlage
- Bibliotheca Philosophica Hermetica, exceptional old books
- Bijbels Museum, biblical museum, also known as the Cromhouthuizen
- Brilmuseum, National Museum of Spectacles, museum about glasses
- Diamond Museum Amsterdam
- Dutch National Holocaust Museum
- Electric Ladyland, museum of fluorescent art
- Erotisch Museum
- Eye Filmmuseum
- Foam Fotografiemuseum Amsterdam, photography museum on the Keizersgracht
- Grachtenmuseum, Museum of the Canals
- Groote Museum, in Artis Zoo
- Hash, Marihuana & Hemp Museum
- H'ART Museum, art museum by the Amstel river
- Hortus Botanicus, botanical garden
- Huis Marseille, Museum for Photography
- Imagine Identity and Culture, about culture and migration in the Bijlmer
- Joods Historisch Museum, about Jewish culture, history and religion
- KattenKabinet, cat museum
- Levend Paarden Museum, at the Hollandsche Manege
- Madame Tussauds Amsterdam, wax figures museum
- Max Euwe-Centrum, museum about chess and the only Dutch chess champion
- Micropia, museum about microbes in Artis Zoo
- Moco Museum, Modern Contemporary Museum Amsterdam
- Molen van Sloten, containing the Kuiperijmuseum, Dutch windmill open for visits
- Multatuli Museum, museum about author of Max Havelaar
- Museum Amsterdam Noord
- Museum Het Schip, museum about the architecture of the Amsterdam School
- Nederlands Uitvaart Museum Tot Zover, museum about funerals
- Museum Van Loon, canal house open for visits
- Museum Vrolik at the AMC Amsterdam, museum about anatomy in academic medical hospital
- Museum Willet-Holthuysen, canal house open for visits
- Museumwoning Tuindorp Oostzaan, house in Amsterdam North
- NEMO Science Museum
- Nieuwe Kerk
- Noorderkerk
- Ons' Lieve Heer op Solder, also known as Museum Amstelkring, canal clandestine church
- Oranje Voetbal Museum
- Oude Kerk
- Royal Palace of Amsterdam
- Pianola Museum, self playing music instrument
- Pipe Museum
- Press Museum, museum of journalistic heritage, affiliated with the International Institute of Social History
- Rembrandt House Museum, museum about Rembrandt in his old house
- Resistance museum, Dutch resistance to Nazi rule
- Rijksmuseum, national museum of the Netherlands
- Scheepvaartmuseum, Maritime Museum Amsterdam
- Sex museum, The temple of Venus
- Stadsarchief Amsterdam, city archive
- Stedelijk Museum, modern and contemporary art
- STRAAT Amsterdam, museum for street art and graffiti art
- Suriname Museum
- Theo Thijssen Museum, museum about writer, teacher and socialist politician Theo Thijssen
- Torture Museum
- Van Eesterenmuseum, museum about architect and urban planner Cornelis van Eesteren
- Van Gogh Museum, dedicated to the work of Vincent van Gogh
- Museum Villa
- Wereldmuseum Amsterdam, previously known as Tropenmuseum, ethnographic museum
- Werf 't Kromhout, one of few shipyards still in use in Amsterdam
- Willem Bilderdijk museum, part of the department Special Collections, University Library Vrije Universiteit (visit by appointment)
- Witsenhuis, in the house of painter and photographer Willem Witsen
- Woonboot Museum, houseboat museum
- World of Ajax
- Zuiderkerk

== Special mentions ==
- Electrische Museumtramlijn Amsterdam, historic electric tram railway
- Fabrique des Lumières
- Heineken Experience, historic brewery and visitors centre
- Het Glazen Huis (Amstelpark)
- Museumhaven Amsterdam
- Rembrandts Amsterdam Experience
- Rijksprentenkabinet, in the Rijksmuseum, but can be visited separately

== See also ==
- List of museums in the Netherlands
- List of most visited museums in the Netherlands
