= Official Museums of Amsterdam =

Association of museums in Amsterdam, the Netherlands

Museums of Amsterdam
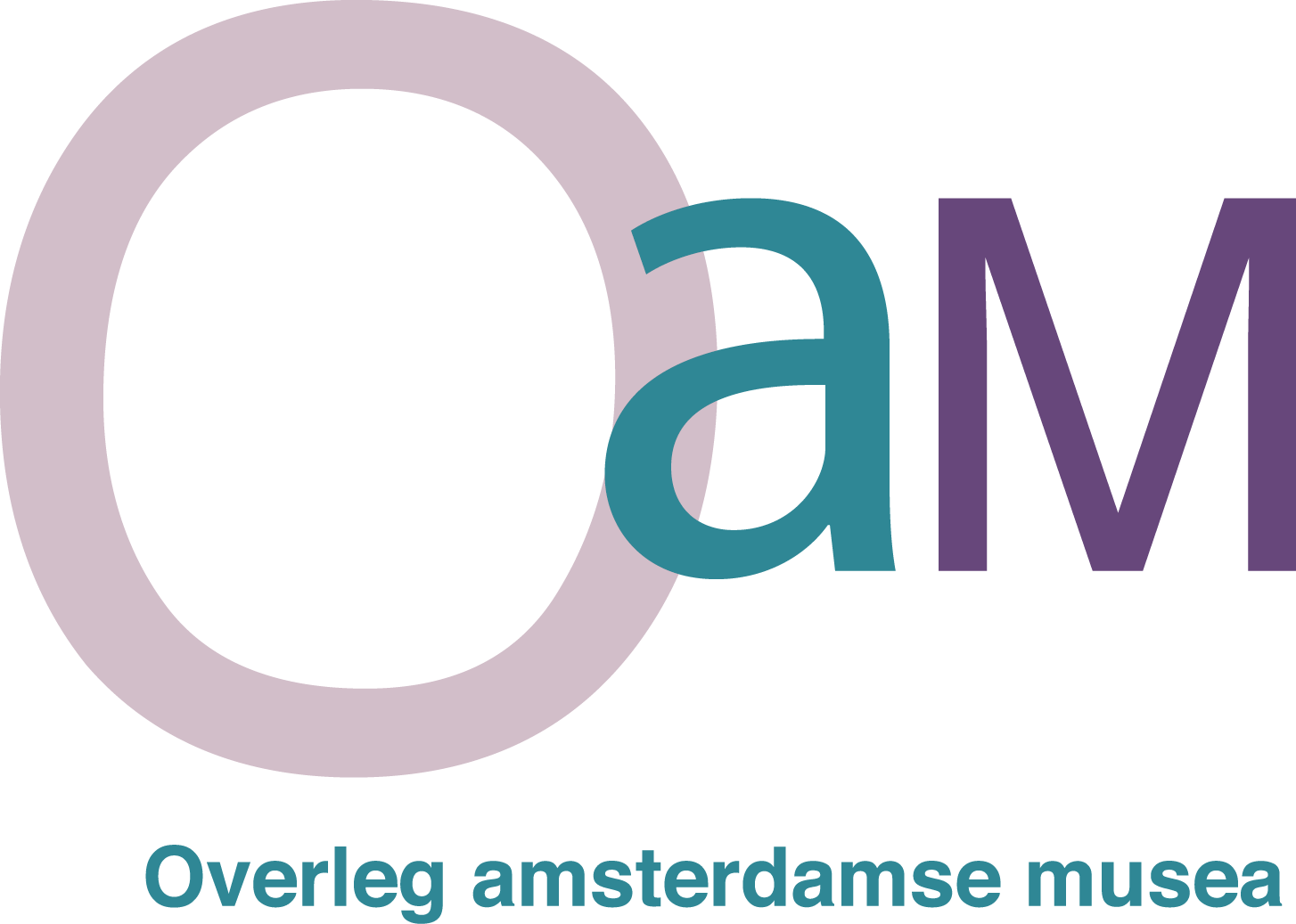
- Native name: Stichting Samenwerkende Amsterdamse Musea (SAM/OAM)
- Industry: arts and culture; heritage
- Founded: 1994 in Amsterdam, Netherlands
- Founder: Bjorn Stenvers
- Headquarters: Nieuwezijds Voorburgwal 359; Amsterdam Museum, Amsterdam, Netherlands
- Area served: Amsterdam, Amstelveen, Zaandam
- Number of employees: 1 (2012)
- Website: amsterdammusea.org/en

Official Museums of Amsterdam (OAM) is a consulting association of museums in Amsterdam. The organisation has existed since the eighties but it was formally founded in 1994. The organization contains both private and public museums, all of which are registered as members of De Museumvereniging, the Dutch Museum Association.

The OAM association has a limited jurisdiction and an elected chair and vice-chair. The present chair is Tonko Grever and the vice-chair is Judikje Kiers (director of Amsterdam Museum).

The 'official' museums of Amsterdam actually do not exist. The name is a misleading translation of the unofficial name of an unincorporated meeting club of mostly government subsidized museums who co-ordinate their marketing to monopolize further government subsidies for city marketing and government assistance. The website of the Jewish Historical Museum slightly more correctly calls them: 'organization' of Amsterdam Museums with an office in the Amsterdam Uitburo or the city's entertainment desk. But the real Dutch name, as in the logo, is 'overleg' or 'meeting.'

The foundation Samenwerkende Amsterdamse Musea (SAM) represents the collective business interests of the OAM. Bjorn Stenvers was founding director of SAM from 2012 to 2017. In 2015 he founded the Amsterdam Museum Academy for museum staff trainings.

The Marketing Overleg der Amsterdamse Musea (MOAM) represents the collective marketing interests of the OAM. All of the heads of marketing and communication of the forty-four partner museums are involved in MOAM. They each act as consultants, contractors, and advisers for the partner museums. The Museum Night (Dutch: Museumnacht, N8) was initiated by the MOAM, but has now become an independent organisation.

== Members ==
The current list of the 44 members:

- Allard Pierson Museum
- Amsterdam Castle
- Amsterdam Centre for Architecture (ARCAM)
- Amsterdam City Archives
- Amsterdam Museum
- Anne Frank House
- de Appel
- Biblical Museum/Cromhout houses
- Cobra Museum
- Diamond Museum Amsterdam
- Dutch Funeral Museum
- The Dutch Maritime Museum
- Eye
- FOAM
- H'ART Museum
- National Holocaust Memorial
- Hortus Botanicus Amsterdam
- Huis Marseille
- Huis met de Hoofden
- Jewish Historical Museum
- JHM Children museum
- Klederdracht museum
- Micropia (museum)
- Multatuli Museum
- Museum of Bags and Purses
- Museum Geelvinck-Hinlopen
- Museum Het Schip
- Museum van de Geest
- Museum Van Loon
- Museum Willet-Holthuysen
- Artis
- NEMO
- Nieuwe Kerk
- Ons' Lieve Heer op Solder
- Oude Kerk
- Pijpenkabinet & Smokiana
- Portugees-Israëlietische Synagoge
- Press Museum
- Rembrandt House Museum
- Rijksmuseum Amsterdam
- Royal Palace of Amsterdam
- Special collections
- Stedelijk Museum
- Museum of the Tropics
- Van Gogh Museum
- Dutch Resistance museum
- Zaans Museum
