= Antorcha (Las Palmas) =

- Founded: 1935
- Ceased publication: 1936
- Political alignment: Anarcho-syndicalism
- Language: Spanish language
- Headquarters: Las Palmas

Antorcha (meaning Torch in English) was a newspaper published from Las Palmas, Spain, briefly between 1935 and 1936. Its early issues carried the subtitle: ‘A fortnightly journal of criticism, doctrine and struggle’.

== History and profile ==
Antorcha was founded as a fortnightly publication 15 February 1935 (?). The newspaper was mainly theoretical in its nature. Antorcha was published by the Manual and Intellectual Workers Syndicate of the Confederación Nacional del Trabajo (CNT).

At the time of the outbreak of the Spanish Civil War in July 1936, publication stopped. Antorcha would later appear as a clandestine organ during the 1940s.

An incomplete collection is held at the International Institute of Social History (IISH/IISG) in Amsterdam.
