= Ezequiel Pini =

Argentinian visual artist

- Born: 1985 (age 40–41); Buenos Aires, Argentina
- Education: University of Buenos Aires
- Occupation: Artist
- Known for: Six N. Five
- Style: Digital art
- Website: www.sixnfive.com

Ezequiel Pini (born 1985 in Buenos Aires, Argentina), also known artistically as Six N. Five, is an Argentinian digital artist and designer who specializes 3D visual art, conceptual design, and CGI. He is the founder of Six N. Five, a design studio based in Barcelona, Spain, where he currently resides.

Pini's installations have been showcased by institutions such as Art Basel, the Moco Museum, and Fotografiska Stockholm. Pini has collaborated with Microsoft, Cartier, LG, Rimowa, and Burberry, and others for conceptual and commercial projects.

He is also known for creating "Bloom", the default wallpaper for Windows 11.

== Early life and education ==
Pini was born in Buenos Aires in 1985. His father was a taekwondo instructor; as a child, Pini regularly practiced taekwondo, representing Argentina in three Taekwondo World Championships and two Taekwondo World Cups, notably earning a silver medal in 71 kg individual combat at the 2004 event in Seoul.

During the mid-2000s, Pini studied Graphic Design at the University of Buenos Aires (UBA), focusing on motion graphics and 3D visualization. In 2014, he co-founded Six N. Five in Buenos Aires before relocating the studio to Barcelona in 2016. The name "Six N. Five" references 6:05 p.m., which refers to personal activities performed after work.

He has also been invited to exhibit or speak at various events, including Art Basel (in collaboration with NetJets and Moco Museum) and Fotografiska Stockholm for the show Somewhere Ethereal.

== Collaborations and projects ==
- Microsoft Surface Wallpapers (2019–2023): Provided digital artworks as official wallpapers for Microsoft's Surface lineup.
- Windows 11 "Bloom" (2021): Created the default wallpaper for Windows 11, blending floral abstraction with refined gradients.
- Daniel Arsham collaboration (2021–2023): Produced NFT-based digital sculptures with American artist Daniel Arsham.
- The Revolt (2021): Developed a digital short film and VR experience.
- The Circle (2022): A short film featured in the permanent exhibition at Moco Museum Amsterdam and Barcelona.
- Flow (2023): Launched a short film included in the Sotheby's 50th Anniversary Contemporary Evening Sale in Hong Kong.
- Moco concept store (2023): Designed a hybrid physical-digital store for Moco Museum in Barcelona.

== Exhibitions ==
=== Solo exhibitions ===
- Cycles (2022) – W1 Curates, Oxford Street, London, UK
- DART (2022) – Museo Della Permanente, Milan, Italy
- Memories of Tomorrow (2023) – Rockbund Art Museum, Shanghai, China
- Among the Sky (2023) – LG Art Lab, Frieze Art Fair, New York, USA
- Symphony of Nature (2023) – Moco Museum, Amsterdam, Netherlands
- Species (2023) – Load Gallery, Barcelona, Spain

=== Group exhibitions ===
- 2017: Exploring Spaces of Tomorrow x Space10, London Design Festival, UK
- 2017: Video Projection Collaboration x Nike (with Unit9), Centre Pompidou, Paris, France
- 2019: Holo-Scandinavian Chair, Fuorisalone – Meet My Project, Milan, Italy
- 2022: Decentral Art Pavilion, Palazzo Giustinian Lolin, Venice, Italy
- 2022: Collectible Design Fair, Brussels, Belgium (with Objects with Narratives)
- 2022: Art Basel, Basel, Switzerland
- 2022: The Red Spot, Somewhere Ethereal, Fotografiska Stockholm, Sweden
- 2023: Flow, Sotheby's Hong Kong, China
- 2023: Artificial Spaces (co-created with Someform), Museu del Disenny, Barcelona, Spain
- 2024: Women and Speed, Richard Mille store, London, UK

== Talks ==
Pini has spoken at numerous design and creativity conferences, including OFFF (Barcelona), Brief Festival (Madrid), and US By Night (Antwerp). In March 2025, he delivered a TEDx talk, "Invisible Borders: Creating Between the Real and the Imaginary," at TEDxDaltVila in Ibiza, Spain.
