= Museumkaart =

Free pass card to Dutch museums

- Industry: arts and culture; heritage; museums
- Founded: 1981; 45 years ago
- Headquarters: Amsterdam, Netherlands
- Area served: Netherlands
- Website: www.museumkaart.nl

The Museum Pass, also known as the Museumkaart in Dutch, is a personal card that grants free entry to approximately 500 museums in the Netherlands for one year. It is available for purchase at many of the larger participating museums or online, with a temporary card issued when purchased from the museum. While most museums offer free entry to Museum Card holders, some museums may charge an additional fee for special exhibitions, but not for general collections.

In 2025, over 1.540.188 people held Museum Cards.

== Museum Card Requirements ==
Buying the card online is only possible for Dutch residents with a Dutch IBAN and a registered Dutch address. Tourists or visitors from other countries who want to purchase the Museum Card can do so at participating museums, where a temporary card is issued, valid for 31 days or 5 visits.

== Mission ==
The Museum Pass is issued by the Dutch Museum Association and aims to promote repeat visits and strengthen the bond between museums and their visitors. The Museum Card Foundation (SMK) operates the cad, organizes the annual Museum Weekend event, and supports the marketing of affiliated museums. The income generated from the card sales benefits the participating museums. Affiliated museums are recognized in the Dutch Museum Register and are members of the Dutch Museum Association.

== Participating museums ==
The Museum Card is available at many of the participating museums, check museum.nl. When bought at a museum you receive a temporary Museum Pass for 3 visits within a month, in that period you must register the pass online for a regular Museum Pass, valid for a whole year. Since 2025 there is a digital Museum Pass available for EU citizens. After activating this digital pass in the Museumkaart app you can visit all the participating museums.

== Usage ==
Year	Cardholders	Price	Visitants	Museums	Visits Per Card	Reimbursement to Museums
1980	145.000					
1989	280.000	ƒ 30	2.000.000			ƒ 6.000.000
1990		ƒ 40				
1992	120.000	ƒ 40				
1993	154.000	ƒ 40				
1994		ƒ 40		408		
1997			3.000.000			ƒ 19.000.000
1998		ƒ 55				
2008	598.486		3.000.000	440	5,4	€ 14.000.000
2009	674.446		3.500.000	440		€ 16.000.000
2010	754.390	€ 40	3.700.000	372		
2011	800.000		4.300.000		5,5	
2012	900.000	€ 45	5.100.000		5,8	
2013	1.000.000	€ 49,95	6.400.000		6,4	€ 37.591.000
2017	1.350.000	€ 59,50	8.700.000	451	6,6	€62 Million (total)
2025	1.540.188	€ 75,00	9.729.549	500	6,46	80 Million

== See also ==
- International Council of Museums (ICOM)
- List of museums in the Netherlands
- Official Museums of Amsterdam
