= Ladyland (disambiguation) =

Ladyland is a German television series. Ladyland may also refer to:

- Barony of Ladyland, near Kilbirnie, Scotland
- Electric Ladyland, third and final studio album by the Jimi Hendrix Experience released in 1968
- Acoustic Ladyland, London-based jazz-punk band
- Electric Ladyland (museum), museum in Amsterdam devoted to items that fluoresce under ultraviolet light
- Ladylands Platform railway station in the village of Kippen, Scotland
- Ladyland, the setting of Begum Rokeya's story Sultana's Dream
