= Nicolaas Wilhelmus Posthumus =

Dutch economic historian and political scientist

- N. W. Posthumus
- Born: 26 February 1880; Amsterdam, Netherlands
- Died: 18 April 1960 (aged 80); Bussum, Netherlands

Academic work
- Discipline: Economic history

Nicolaas Wilhelmus Posthumus (26 February 1880 – 18 April 1960) was a Dutch economic historian, political scientist, and professor at Erasmus University Rotterdam.

Posthumus was one of the founders of both the International Institute of Social History in Amsterdam and the Faculty of Political and Social Sciences at the University of Amsterdam.

== Biography ==
Posthumus was born as the son of geography teacher Nicolaas Wilhelmus Posthumus and Huibertje IJzerman. He graduated high school and began studying at the University of Amsterdam in 1898. From March to October 1901, he was editor of the satirical student magazine Propria Cures. In 1908 he graduated with a Doctorate of Public Sciences, writing his dissertation on the "History of the Leidsche sheet industry".

After graduation, Posthumus studied a few years of economics and trade law at the municipal trade school in Amsterdam. In 1913, he became a professor of economic history at the Netherlands School of Commerce in Rotterdam. In 1915, he founded and published the Economisch-Historisch Jaarboek—a yearly collection of primary source documents and empirical analysis of Dutch merchant records. In 1918-1919 he succeeded Gijsbert Weijer Jan Bruins as Rector Magnificus of the university. In 1922 he was appointed as a lecturer at the Faculty of Arts and Philosophy in Amsterdam, and in 1932 he founded the Economic Historical Library.

Following the rise of the Nazi party in Germany, Posthumus founded the International Institute of Social History in 1935 as a place to retain socialist documents and histories safe from the Nazi regime and other governments which might exert control over them. When Germany invaded the Netherlands the activities of the institute were disrupted. He was dismissed in 1942 by the government of the occupied Netherlands and returned to his post only following the war. During the war he managed to publish Inquiry into the History of Prices in Holland. Vol. i, an exhaustive empirical study of market prices and rates of exchange in Amsterdam from the 16th century until the First World War, made within the International scientific committee on price history. The work was favorably received and remains his most widely cited to date.

After the war he wrote a history of the German occupation of the Netherlands entitled The Netherlands During German Occupation. He worked with various institutes, including the Dutch Institute for War Documentation and held a full professorship in Economic and Social Sciences at the University of Amsterdam until 1949, when he resigned to head the Brill publishing house. The N.W. Posthumus Instituut, a graduate research facility in economics at the University of Groningen, was founded in 1988 in his honor.

In 1929 Posthumus became member of the Royal Netherlands Academy of Arts and Sciences, he was forced to resign in 1942. In 1945 he was readmitted as member. From 1946 to 1958, Posthumus was Director of scientific publisher Brill. From 1 January 1949 to his death, Posthumus was chairman of the Dutch Economic Historical Archive, which he founded in 1913.

On 20 July 1908 Posthumus married Marcel Dorothea van Loon, with whom he a daughter and a son. He divorced her in 1928. On 7 January 1931 Posthumus married his second wife Willemijn van der Goot, a feminist and the first Dutch woman to earn a doctorate in economics. They had one child, Claire, in Amsterdam in 1938, shortly before moving to Noordwijk aan Zee and later Leiden for the duration of World War II.

During the war, he and his family helped relocate Jewish children from Amsterdam to foster families. He and Willy cared for a child, Bertha Eveline Koster, in their own home from 1943 to 1945. Posthumus, Van der Goot, and sister-in-law Diaz-van der Goot received the "Righteous Among the Nations" recognition. Posthumus and Van der Goot separated in 1950.
