= Amsterdam Tulip Museum =

- Tulpenmuseum Amsterdam

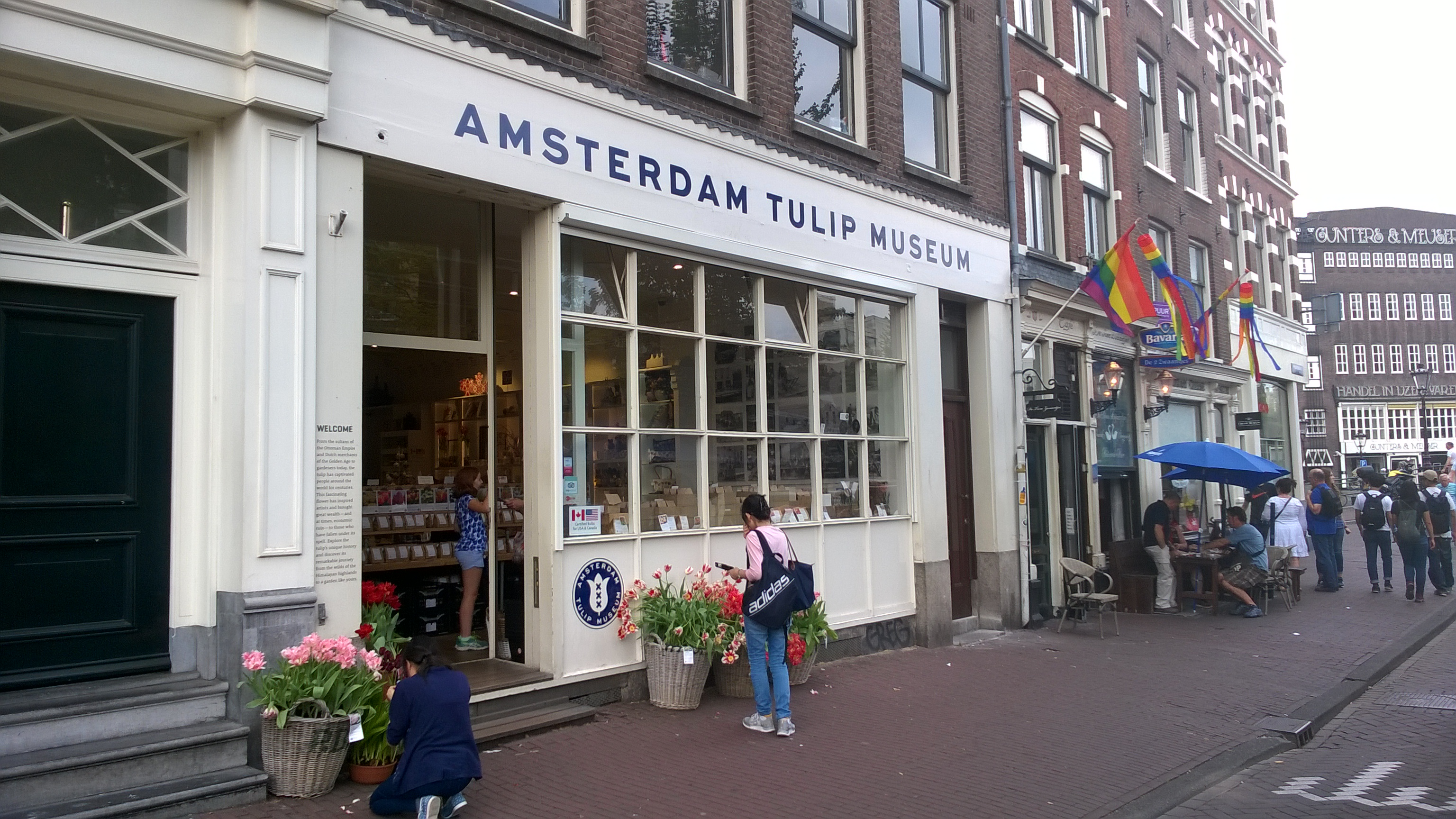
- Amsterdam Tulip Museum, Amsterdam (2018)
- Established: 2004
- Location: Prinsengracht 116, 1015 EA Amsterdam, NL
- Coordinates: 52.376111°N 4.883889°E
- Type: Private
- Collections: Tulips
- Website: amsterdamtulipmuseum.com

Amsterdam Tulip Museum (2004) ATM is a small museum in Amsterdam. The museum features exhibits about the story of the tulip. The museum is in a canal house, along the Prinsengracht canal.

== History ==
The museum was established in 2004 on the Prinsengracht in the Jordaan neighborhood of Amsterdam. The museum was started by three Dutch bulbsmen. One of the museum's founders is a wholesale flowerbulb distributor in the United States, Colorblends in Bridgeport, Connecticut. One of the other founders is Fluwel, a European bulb supplier. The museum is located across the bridge from the Anne Frank House.

It has 2,200 sq ft (200 m^{2}) of floor space and the exhibits in the museum trace the history of the tulip from its origins in the Himalayas to its arrival in the court of the Ottoman Sultan Suleiman the Magnificent (1494-1566) to modern day cultivation in The Netherlands.

The museum features an exhibit which explores the famous Tulip mania of the 1630s. The tumultuous Tulip trade led to one of history’s most infamous market crashes. The museum also features exhibits of Ottoman-style Tulip-themed art and ceramics, bulb industry artifacts and films about tulips. The Tulip Museum shop sells Dutch flower bulbs. The museum has multimedia presentations which are viewable on LCD screens.

== See also ==
- List of museums in Amsterdam
- List of museums in the Netherlands
- List of most visited museums in the Netherlands
