= Colorblends =

American bulb wholesaler

Colorblends Wholesale Flowerbulbs
- Industry: Horticulture
- Predecessor: Schipper & Company
- Founded: 1912; 113 years ago in Amsterdam, NL
- Founder: Cornelis Nicolaas Schipper
- Products: Flower bulbs
- Website: colorblends.com

Colorblends is a wholesaler/distributor of flower bulbs based in Bridgeport, Connecticut. The company was founded in the Netherlands by the Schipper family in 1912. Colorblends serves landscape professionals and ambitious residential gardeners.

== Background ==
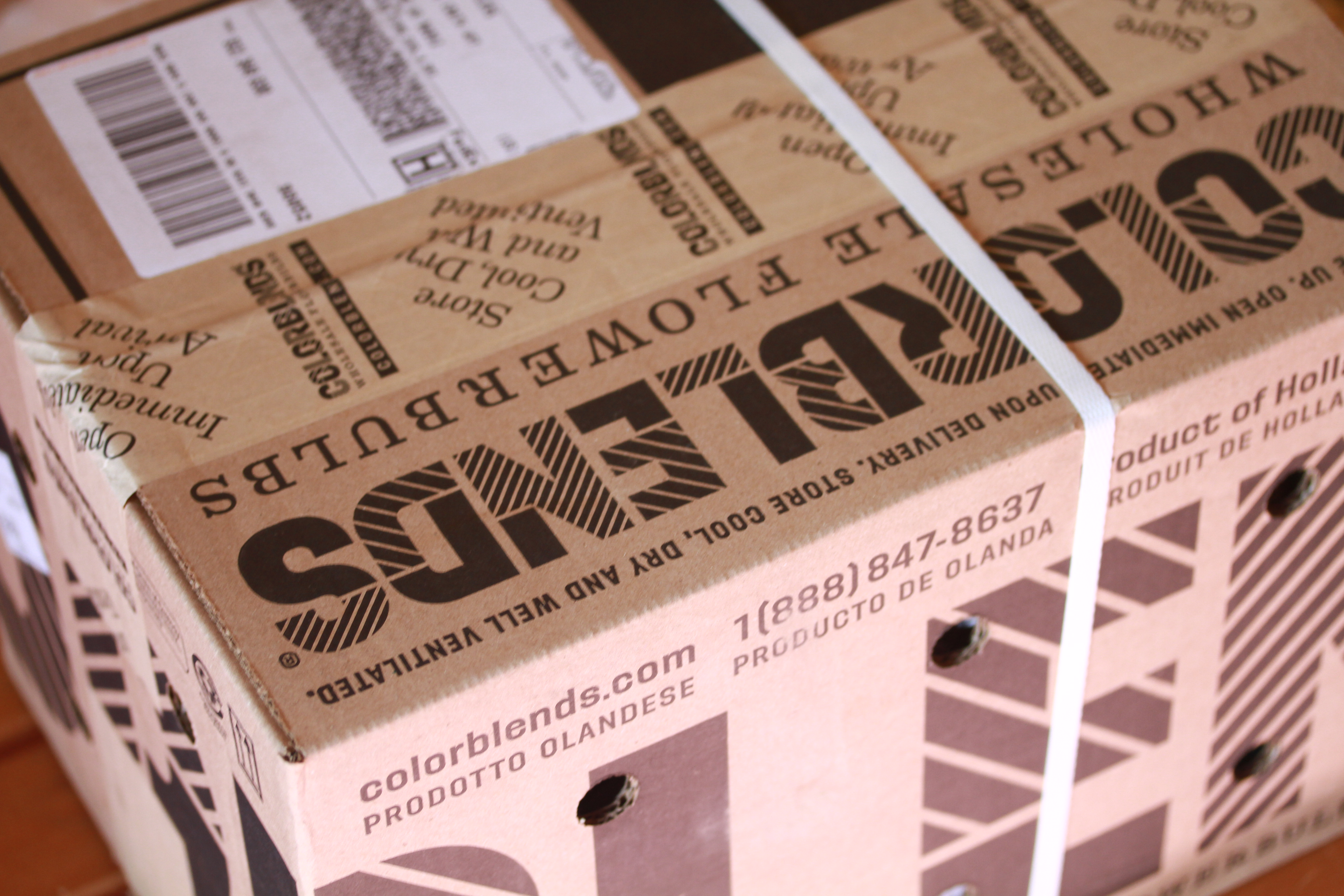
Colorblends wholesale flower bulbs cardboard box

The company's website states that Schipper & Company started in the Netherlands in 1912. Cornelis Schipper moved the company to the United States after World War II. Cornelis Nicolaas Schipper was born into a tulip farming family and emigrated to the United States in 1947. When he arrived in the United States he borrowed $1000 and purchased a car. He drove from town to town receiving orders for flower bulbs. He serviced florists and wholesale growers.

Schipper & Company USA is still a privately owned business and Colorblends is part of the company. The company is located on the east side of Bridgeport, Connecticut at 747 Barnum Avenue and they feature a spring flower display garden attraction called the "Colorblends House and Spring Garden" which is located on 893 Clinton Ave on the west side of Bridgeport. The company operates under the trade names: Colorblends Wholesale Flowerbulbs.

=== Museum ===
Colorblends is one of the founders of the Amsterdam Tulip Museum in the Netherlands.
