= Museum tot zover =

Museum in Amsterdam, Netherlands

Museum Tot Zover
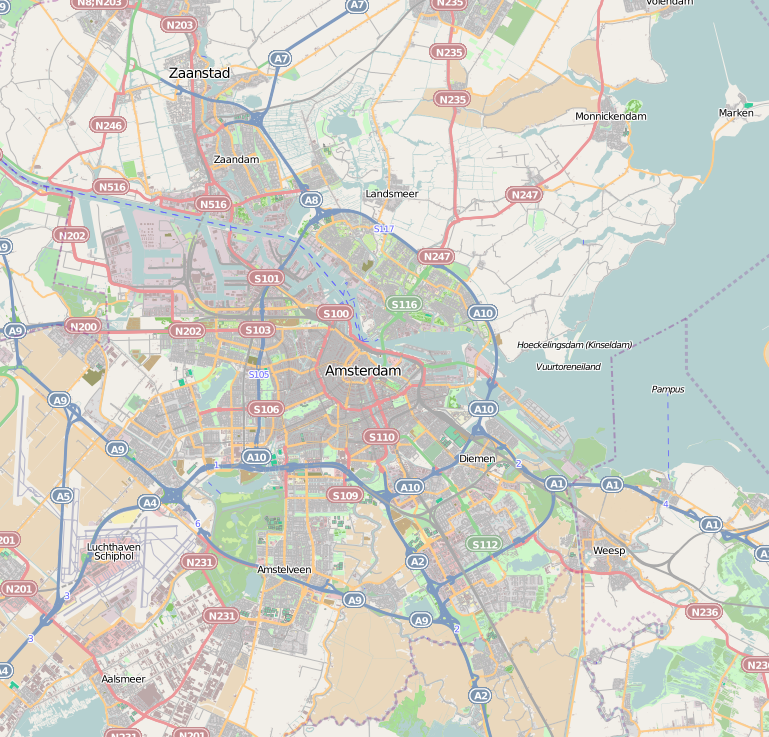
- Location in the city of Amsterdam
- Established: 19 December 2007
- Location: Kruislaan 124; Amsterdam, Netherlands
- Coordinates: 52°20′46″N 4°56′19″E
- Director: Guus Sluiter
- Website: www.totzover.nl

The Nederlands Uitvaart Museum Tot Zover (Dutch Funeral Museum So Far) is a museum in Amsterdam, Netherlands that displays the various funerary practices of the various cultures present in the Netherlands, with the view that these funerary practices provide a better understanding of these cultures.

The museum is located in De Nieuwe Ooster, a memorial park in Amsterdam that includes a cemetery and crematorium. The original building was designed as a caretaker’s residence by Adriaan Willem Weissman (1858–1923), who was a Dutch city architect best known for designing the Stedelijk Museum.

The collection includes items involved in funerary practices such as funerary masks, caskets and urns, as well as paintings and movie clips that demonstrate these funerary practices. The museum explores death and funerary practices along four themes: rituals, the body, mourning and remembrance, and memento mori.

In addition to its collection, the Museum Tot Zover hosts temporary exhibitions of art and history. One of the museum’s exhibitions is “The Last Image,” which is a digital, online exhibition to which anyone can submit content. The premise of this ongoing exhibition is to explore the implications of photography and digital space in the process of death and dying.
