= Amsterdam Pipe Museum =

Coordinates: 52°21′49.9″N 4°53′8.7″E

- Pijpenkabinet
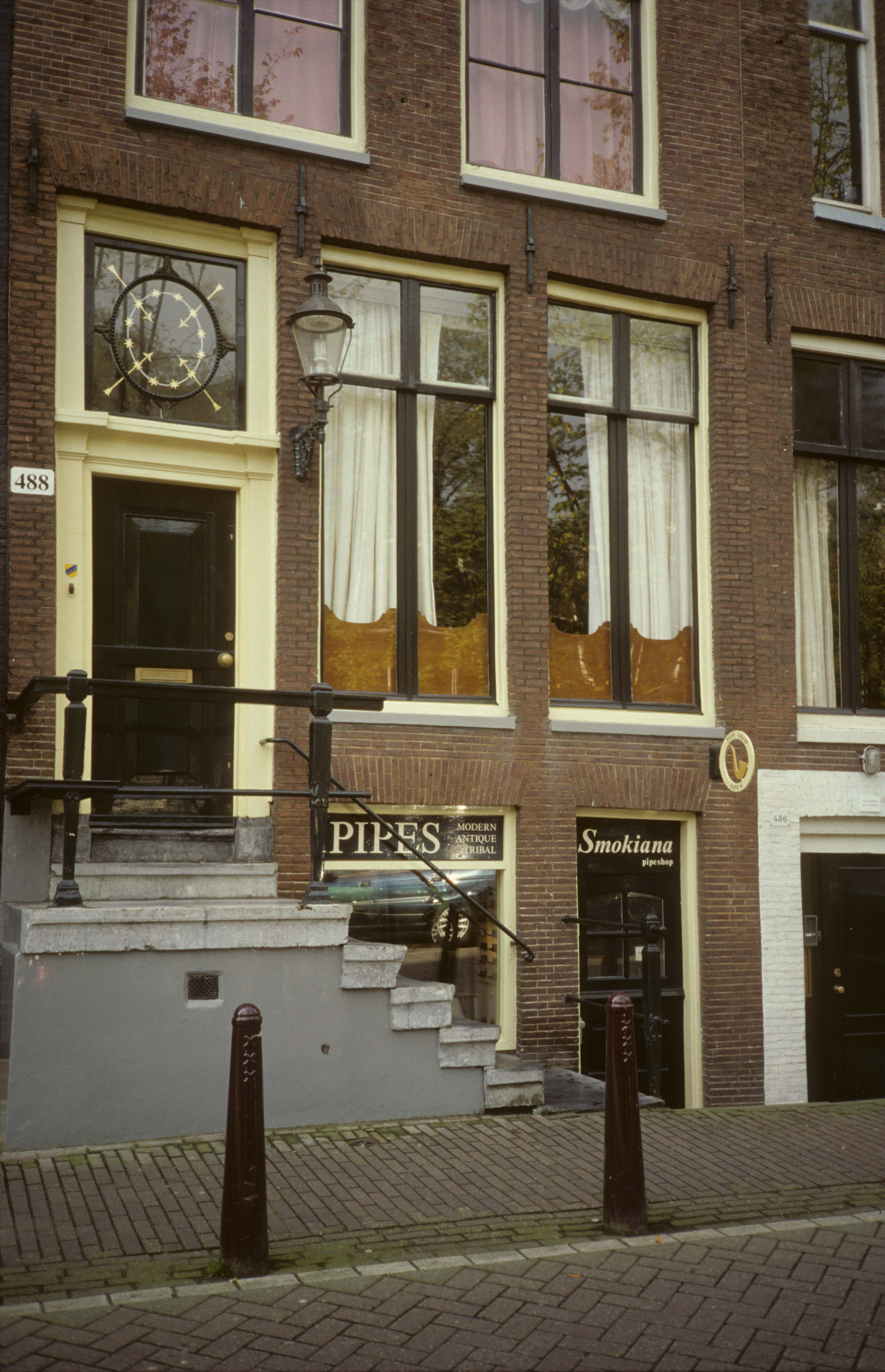
- Established: 1969
- Location: Prinsengracht 488, 1017 KH Amsterdam, Netherlands
- Type: cultural history museum
- Accreditation: ICOM, Official Museums of Amsterdam
- Collection size: tobacco and other smoking pipes and related items
- Director: Benedict Goes
- Curator: D.H. Duco MA
- Public transit access: tram 1, 2, 5 from Amsterdam Central Station, stop Prinsengracht
- Parking: Prinsengracht 540 (indoor)
- Website: http://www.pijpenkabinet.nl/, http://pipemuseum.nl/ (fully in Dutch and English)

The Amsterdam Pipe Museum (formerly Dutch: Pijpenkabinet, "pipe cabinet") is a museum in Amsterdam, the Netherlands, dedicated to smoking pipes, tobacco, and related paraphernalia. It holds the national reference collection (nl) in these areas.

The permanent exhibition of the Amsterdam Pipe Museum displays over 2,000 items representing the variety of smoking pipes and utensils that have been used in all parts of the world over the past 25 centuries.

== History ==
The Amsterdam Pipe Museum (Pijpenkabinet) was founded as a private collection in 1969. From 1975 to 1982 the collection was on display in an art gallery at Frederiksplein, Amsterdam. The focus was mainly on clay tobacco pipes for which Holland has been famous.

In 1982 the Pijpenkabinet moved to Leiden, where it functioned as a public museum until 1995. The collection was enlarged with historic and ethnographic items. The museum actively published its scientific historic research.

In 1995 the Pijpenkabinet moved to its present location in Amsterdam. It can be found in a typical Amsterdam canal house along the Prinsengracht, between the Leidseplein and the National Museum (the Rijksmuseum). The museum now shows all sorts of pipes, including works-of-art like the carved meerschaum pipes and hand-painted porcelain pipe bowls.

When the Niemeyer tobacco museum in Groningen shut down in 2011, the Amsterdam Pipe Museum acquired some four hundred items from its collection before the rest was auctioned off, stating that its acquisition preserved the "core" of the former museum's collection.

== Collection ==
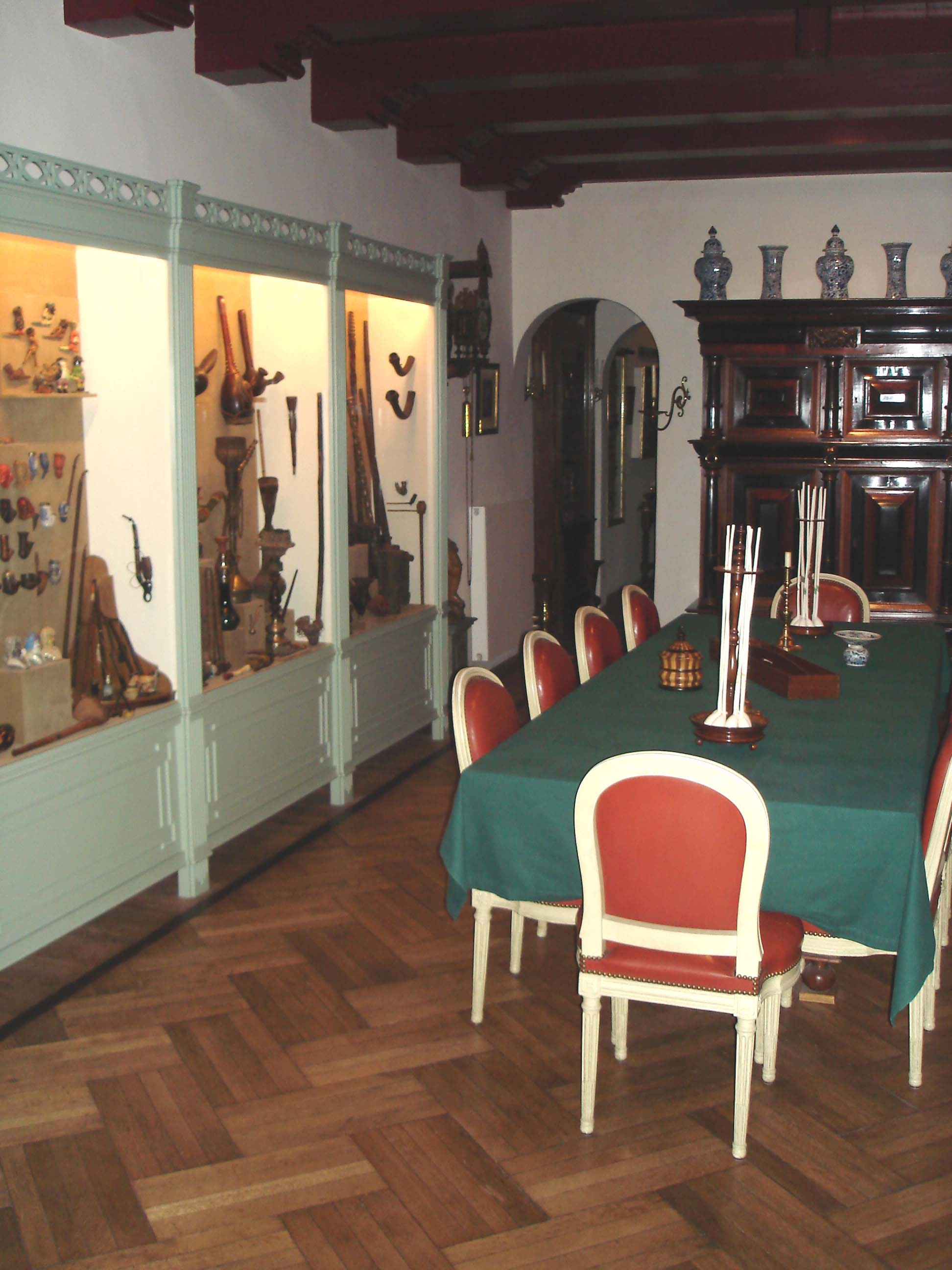
Interior of the Amsterdam Pipe Museum, main room

The collection of the Amsterdam Pipe Museum has been growing since the day of its establishment due to a policy of regular acquisitions. It now counts more than 25,000 items, which are systematically arranged and stored in the museum's storage room. It includes artifacts of the cultural history of smoking from nearly all continents. A representative selection is displayed in tailor-made cabinets.

The collection itself is the worldwide archive for pipes and serves as source of information for multiple scientific papers and publications. In 1993 it was awarded with the A-status within National Collections by the Ministry of Culture and Science of the Netherlands.

The Amsterdam Pipe Museum’s collection has the following categories:

- pre-Columbian era: pipes dating back to the prehistoric times of smoking over 2500 years ago
- archaeological: mostly clay pipes discovered during archaeological excavations in the Netherlands as well as in other parts of Europe
- clay pipes: historical smoking pipes from the 19th and 20th centuries, including complete surveys of several manufacturers
- porcelain pipes: artistically modeled and skillfully painted pipe bowls in European porcelain
- meerschaum pipes: tobacco pipes and cigar holders with characteristic shapes and highly artistic carving
- wooden pipes: early specimen from various types of wood as well as a survey of the popular briar pipe
- other smoking pipes: smoking implements made of ivory, bone, stone, glass, metal, hard rubber etc.
- ethnographic: indigenous pipes from Africa, Asia and America, including water pipes
- opium pipes: original Chinese examples and counterparts from other countries, including opium paraphernalia
- pipe makers tools: the technical aspect of the craft, including a large set of moulds for making clay pipes
- tobacco curiosities: objects related to pipe smoking, such as tobacco boxes, pipe stands, etc.
- prints and drawings: illustrations of smokers from all periods
- records: original documents, manuscripts, ordinances and pamphlets on pipes and pipe production, tobacco trade, etc.
- tobacco wrappers and vignettes: historic and modern wrappers and packages for pipe tobacco, cigars and cigarettes
- library: international library with thousands of books and articles on pipes and smoking related issues

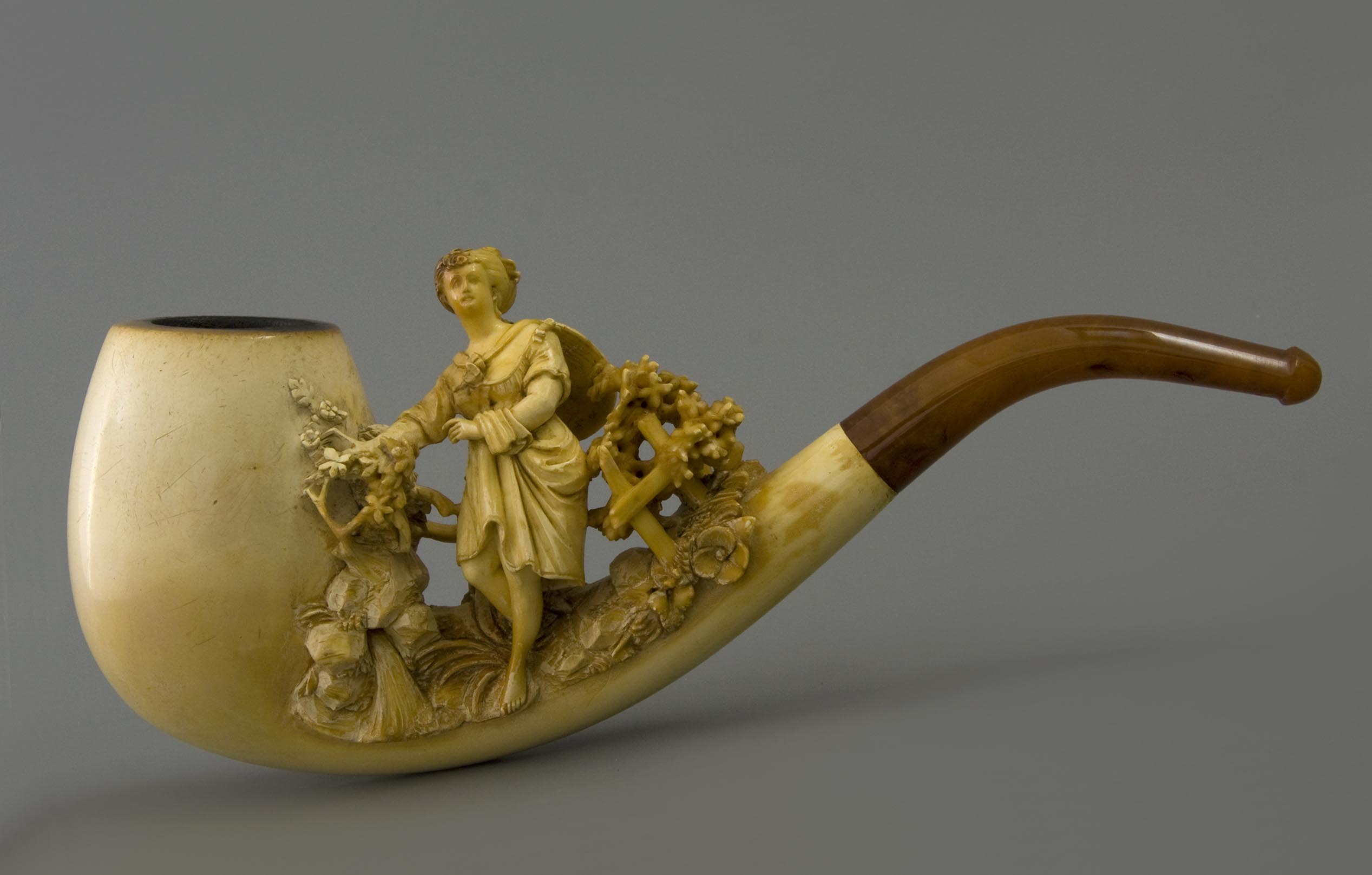
Carved meerschaum pipe, made in the United States, 1890

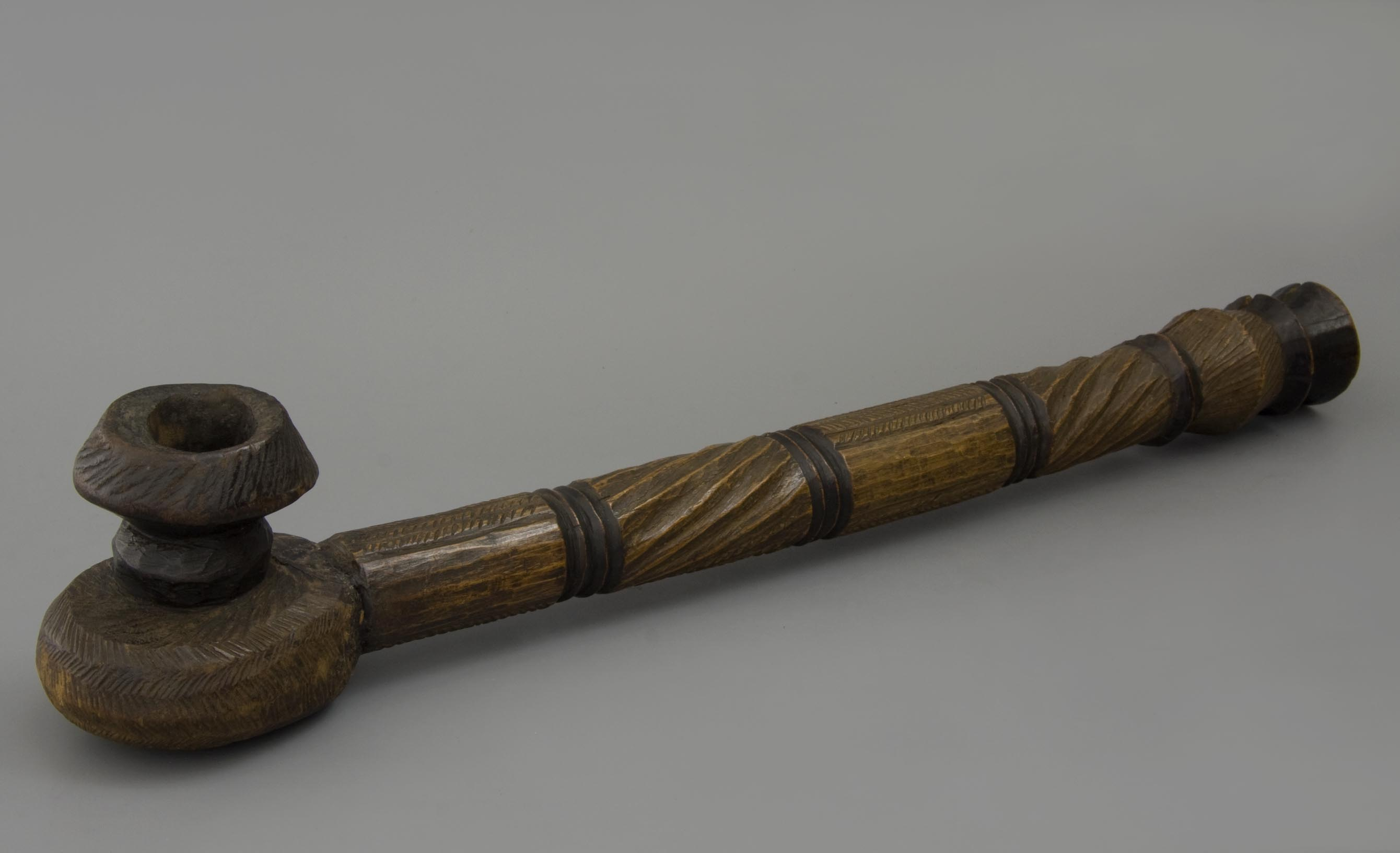
An early wooden Congo pipe by the Mondombe tribe

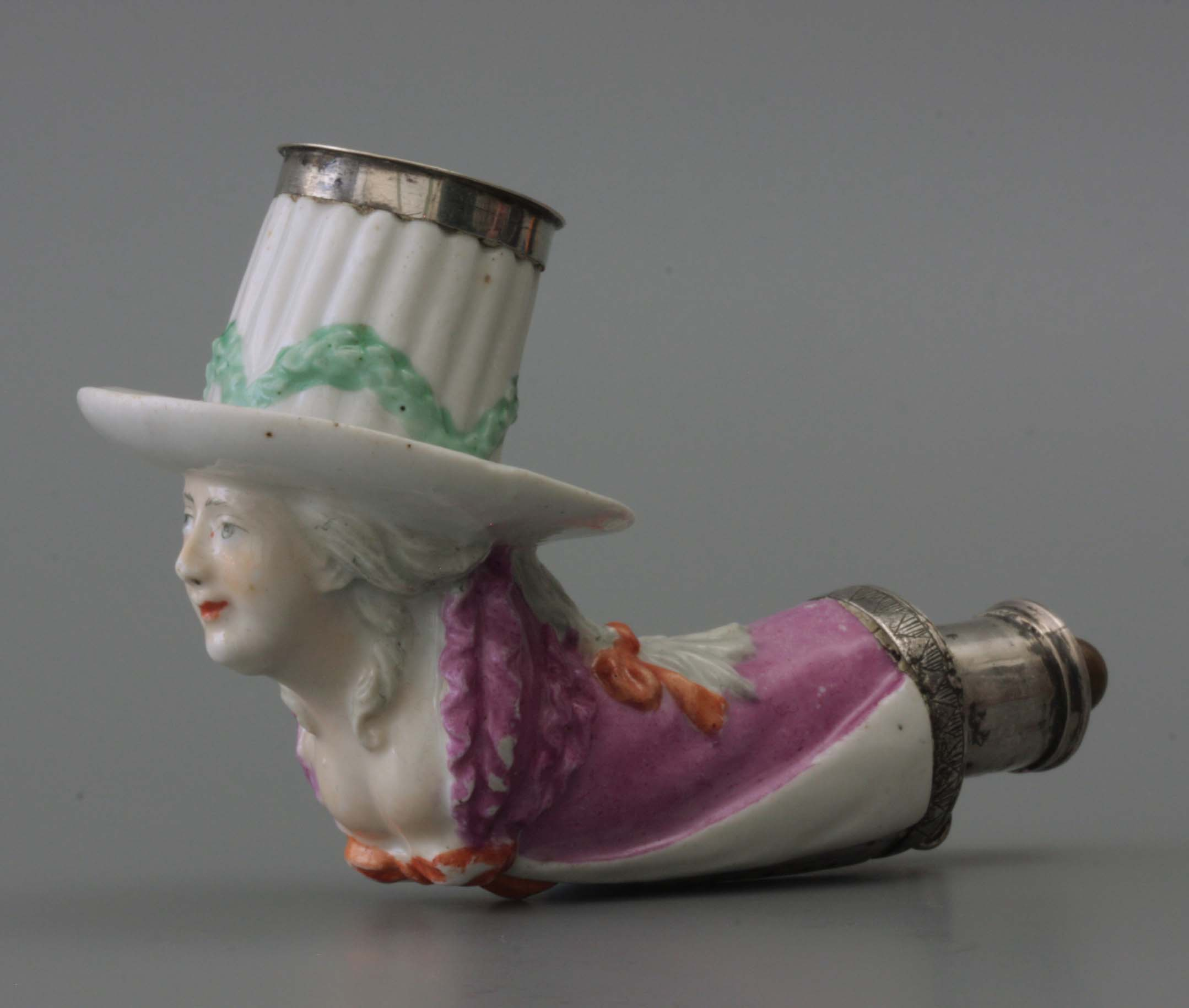
Figural porcelain pipe, Ludwigsburg, Germany, mid-18th century

== Building ==
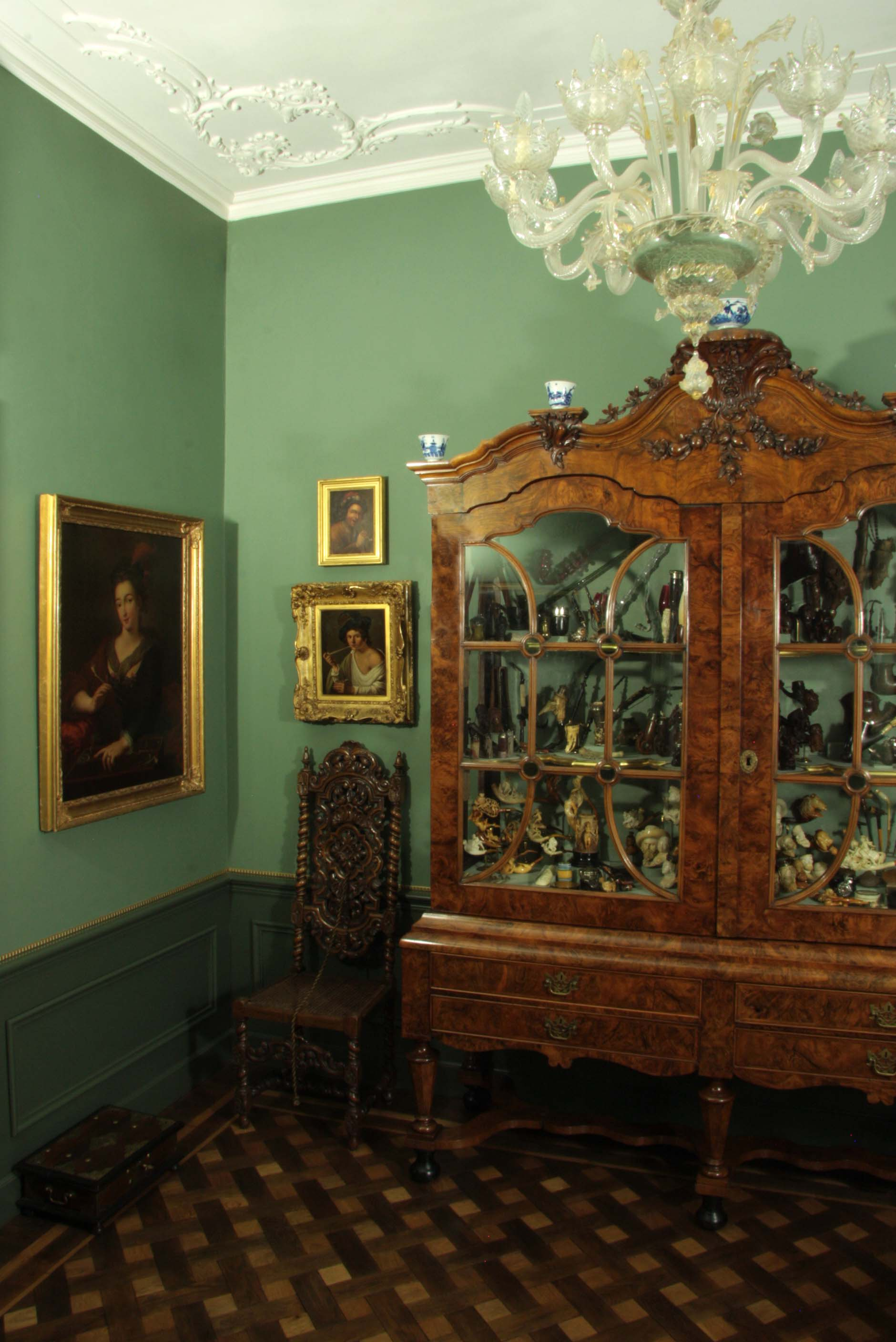
Interior of the Amsterdam Pipe Museum, cabinet of curiosities

The Amsterdam Pipe Museum is located in a historic building in the centre of Amsterdam. It is a typical Amsterdam canal house at Prinsengracht built around 1680. It was renovated around 1800: the windows were enlarged and the gable top was changed into a cornice, leaving the dark stone steps and the fan-light above the front door authentic. The interior still witness the history of three centuries, with its carefully restored stucco corridor with marble paneling, authentic beam ceilings with carved decorations, the use of original colors etc.

The basement entrance leads to the museum shop Smokiana pipeshop. The various floors of the building hold the library and documentation centre.

== Research and publications ==
Historical research is an ongoing activity. Museum knowledge is spread through publications in international magazines, issued as books or available on its website. The museum has issued books on the archeology of the clay tobacco pipes and its marks. More recently, the 19th-century development of the clay pipe industry in Europe was published in an illustrated book: Century of Change: The European Clay Pipe, Its Final Flourish and Ultimate Fall. This includes the French fashion of the portrait pipes and its influence on other production centers.

The curator of the museum also studied the history of opium smoking, resulting in a book on opium and opium pipes with an international bibliography on the subject. Many publications can be found searching the name of the curator: Don Duco.

In 2026 Duco's latest book was published, entitled De Nederlandse kleipijp (The Dutch Clay Tobacco Pipe, handbook for Identification). With this book any clay pipe can be dated and indentified, thanks to a wealth of illustrated examples with proper identificaten onad a link to the scientific details on the museums website.

== Services ==
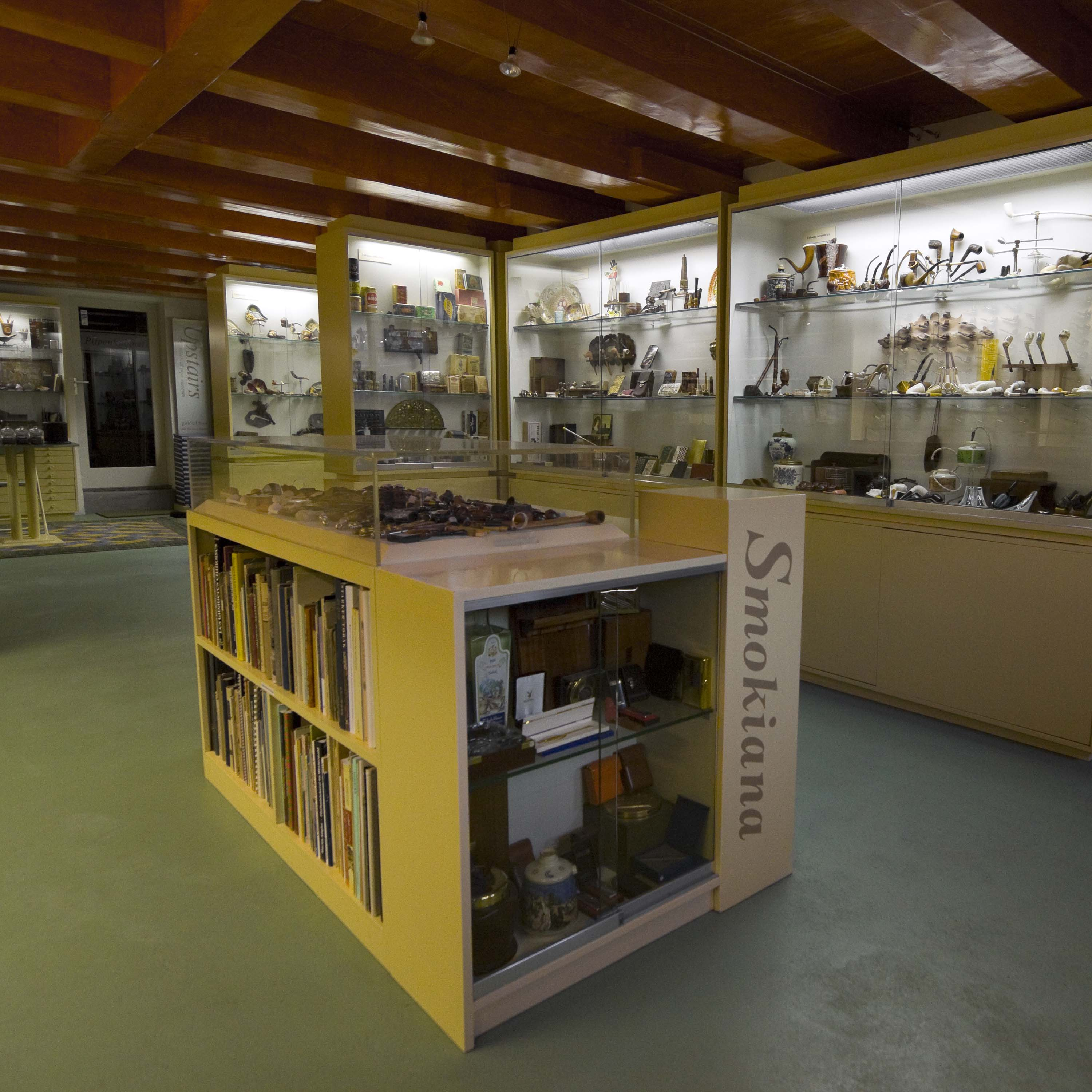
Interior of the museum shop of the Amsterdam Pipe Museum

The museum staff provides information to identify pipes from archaeological excavations or kept as an antiquity. Since the Dutch clay pipes, produced mainly in Gouda, were shipped to all countries where the West- and East-India Companies were active – virtually the full known world during the 17th and 18th centuries – Dutch pipe finds are known from all over the world, from Japan to New York, from Spitsbergen (North Pole) to Cape Town.
