= Moco Museum =

Art museum in Amsterdam, Barcelona, and London

- Established: April 2016
- Location: Honthorststraat 20, 1071 DE Amsterdam, NL
- Type: Modern & Contemporary Art Museum
- Visitors: 610,000 (2024)
- Website: mocomuseum.com

The Moco Museum (Modern Contemporary Museum) is an independent art museum with locations in Amsterdam, Barcelona, and London, dedicated to exhibiting modern and contemporary art. The museum was founded with the mission of attracting broader and younger audiences, and making art accessible to the public.

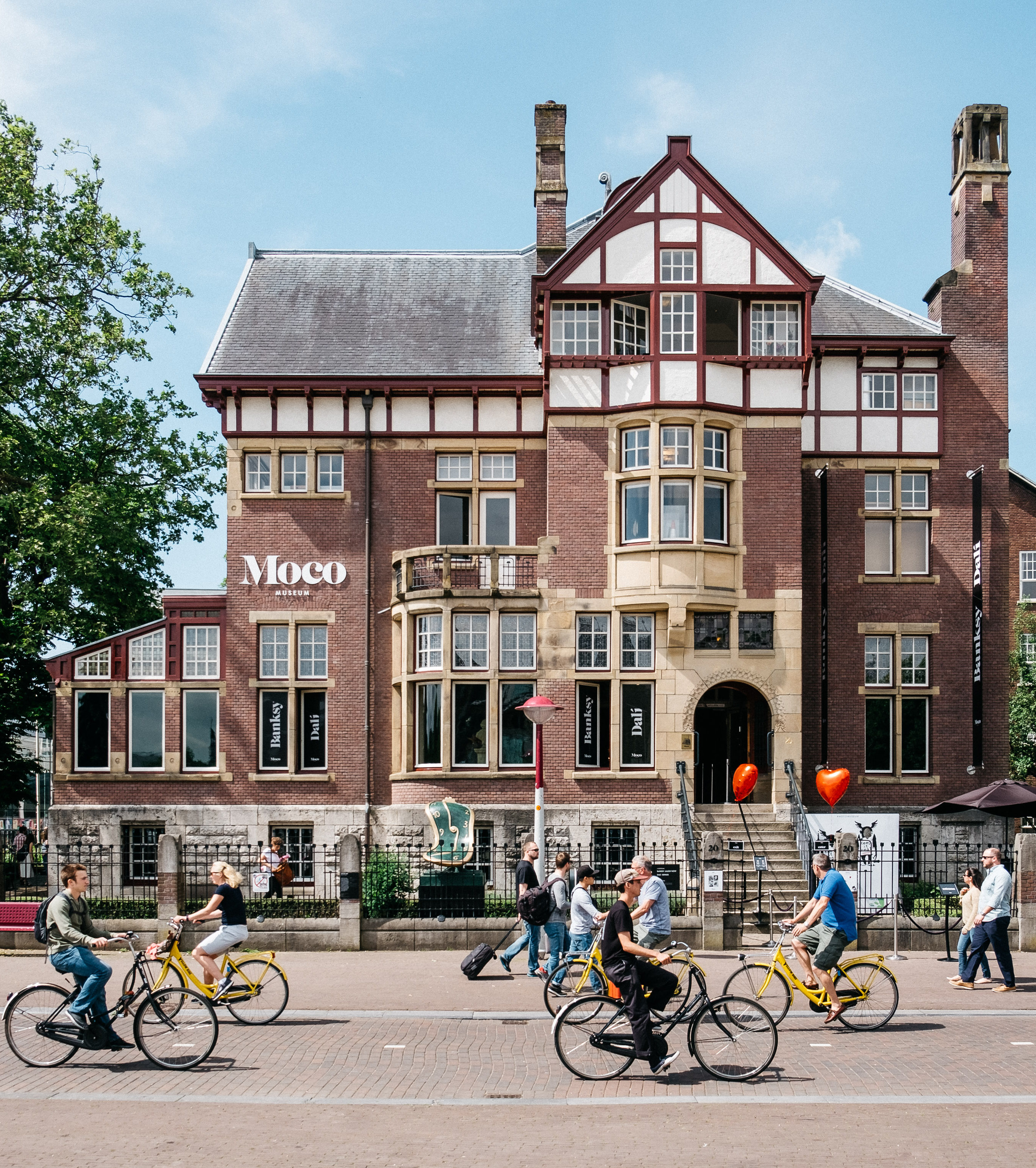
Moco Museum in Amsterdam

Moco Museum in Amsterdam opened in 2016 on Museumplein, in the historic Villa Alsberg, a townhouse designed in 1904 by Eduard Cuypers the nephew of Pierre Cuypers, designer of Amsterdam Central Station and the Rijksmuseum. The townhouse was one of the first privately owned residencies on Museumplein and remained so until 1939.

== History and concept ==
The museum was founded in 2016 by Kim Logchies-Prins and Lionel Logchies as an independent initiative aiming "to make modern and contemporary art more accessible to a wider audience beyond traditional collectors and institutions". Early collections and programming focused on popular modern and contemporary figures and street art, aiming to reach broader audiences through accessible exhibitions, and included works by artists such as Banksy and Andy Warhol. Commentators have described the museum as part of a broader shift towards privately funded art spaces that combine high-profile popular culture with contemporary art collections, including digital and immersive works.

== Building ==
The Moco Museum Amsterdam is located in Villa Alsberg on Honthorststraat 20 in Amsterdam. Designed in 1904 by Eduard Cuypers, it was originally built for banker Siegmund Alsberg and remained the first privately owned residence on the Museumplein until 1939. The interior has been adapted for gallery use, including spaces for immersive and digital installations.

== Collections and exhibitions ==
The museum displays works from its permanent collection as well as loaned pieces, which are exhibited in rotation. Programming combines works from the Moco collection with external loans, presented in regularly changing displays. Exhibited artists have included Banksy, Andy Warhol, Jean-Michel Basquiat, Keith Haring, Yayoi Kusama, KAWS, Jeff Koons, JR, Icy & Sot, Tracey Emin, and Studio Irma, among others.

=== Past exhibitions ===
- Roy Lichtenstein: Lasting Influence (2017)
- Icy & Sot: A Moment of Clarity (2018) – the first retrospective of the Iranian street-art brothers and political activists.
- Daniel Arsham: Connecting Time (2019) – the New York-based artist's Dutch debut.
- Yayoi Kusama (2019) – featuring works including Night of Stars and Pumpkin.
- JR Room (2019) – including The Gun Chronicles: A Story of America by French artist JR.
- THE KID: The Future Is Old (2020) – the artist's first solo exhibition in the Netherlands.

=== Current exhibitions ===
- Robbie Williams: Pride and Self-Prejudice (2024) – a multimedia exhibition exploring identity and self-reflection.
- The Symphony of Nature (2023) – by design studio Six N. Five.
- Andrés Reisinger: Dreams (2024)
- Planet Positive Disruption (2024) – by Dutch street artist Frankey.

=== Ongoing exhibitions ===
- Banksy: Laugh Now – an "unauthorised" exhibition featuring works such as Beanfield, Girl with a Balloon and Flower Thrower.
- Contemporary Masters: Meet the Icons & Rising Stars in Contemporary Art – featuring works by Marina Abramović, Damien Hirst, KAWS, Jeff Koons and others.
- Modern Masters: Meet the Icons of Modern Art – featuring works by Andy Warhol, Jean-Michel Basquiat, Keith Haring and Yayoi Kusama.
- Digital & Immersive Art – including the installation Reflecting Forward: In Search of Connectivism by Studio Irma.
- Moco Garden – the museum's outdoor exhibition featuring works by Banksy, KAWS, WhIsBe, Fidia and Marcel Wanders.

== Visitors ==
Moco Museum Amsterdam is among the most visited private museums in the city. According to Amsterdam Tips, the museum recorded approximately 769,000 visitors in 2023, marking its highest attendance since opening. In 2024, visitor numbers declined to around 610,000, representing a decrease of approximately 21 percent year-on-year.

The museum is regularly listed among Amsterdam's cultural attractions in independent city guides such as I amsterdam and Time Out.

Across all its locations, the Moco Museum group reports having welcomed more than six million visitors from over 120 countries since its founding in 2016.

Annual visitor numbers – Moco Museum Amsterdam
Year	Visitors	Source	Notes
2023	769,000	Amsterdam Tips	Highest recorded attendance year
2024	610,000	Amsterdam Tips	Approximately 21% decline from 2023

== Location and access ==
Moco Museum Amsterdam is located on Museumplein, opposite the Rijksmuseum and adjacent to the Van Gogh Museum and the Stedelijk Museum.

The museum is accessible by public transport via the Museumplein and Rijksmuseum tram stops, which are served by tram lines 2, 5, and 12. It is also within walking distance of Leidseplein and Vondelpark.

Moco Museum Amsterdam is open daily, with extended opening at evening hours on weekends.

== See also ==
- Moco Museum Barcelona
- Moco Museum London
- List of museums in Amsterdam
- Modern art museums
