= Museum Villa =

Art museum in Amsterdam

Coordinates: 52.386138°N 4.875298°E

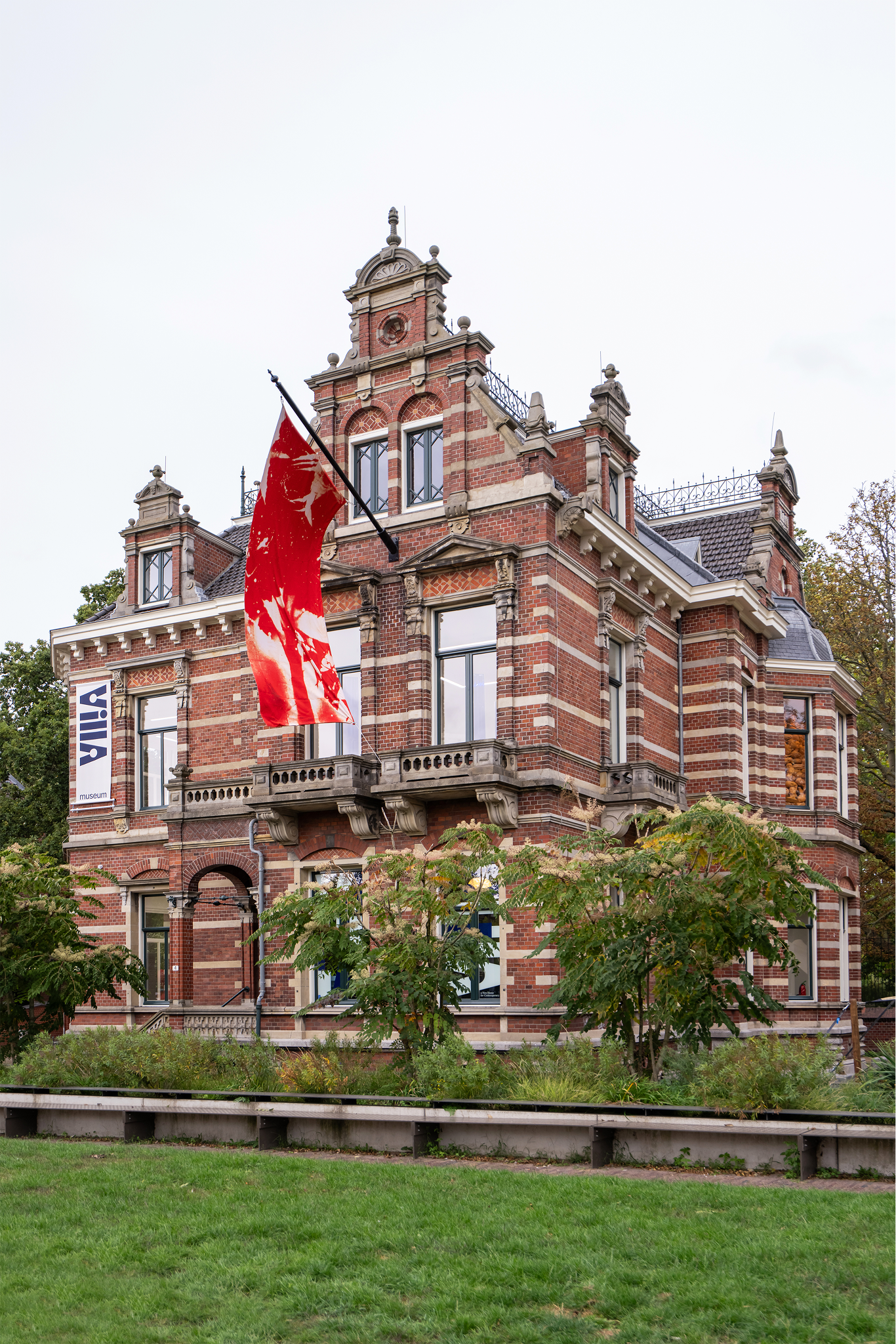
- Museum Villa at the Westergasterrein in Amsterdam
- Established: 2025
- Location: Haarlemmerweg 4, Amsterdam, Netherlands
- Type: Contemporary art museum
- Director: Adam Nillissen; Bas Koopmans; Cas Boland
- Website: www.museumvilla.com

Museum Villa is a contemporary art museum in Amsterdam, the Netherlands. It opened to the public on 13 September 2025 and is located in a renovated monumental building on the Westergasfabriek area in Amsterdam-West. The museum presents rotating exhibitions of contemporary art, with an emphasis on visitor experience and room-based presentations.

== History ==
Museum Villa was founded in 2025 and is housed in a former engineer’s residence on the Westergasterrein, a cultural area in Amsterdam-West. The museum was established as a private initiative and presents exhibitions featuring both established and emerging artists. Museum Villa is located on the Westergasterrein in Amsterdam-West, an area that hosts several cultural institutions and creative venues.

Museum Villa does not maintain a permanent collection. Instead, it presents changing exhibitions in which individual small rooms are dedicated to single artists, or artworks. This curatorial approach prioritizes direct engagement with artworks over extensive contextual interpretation.

== Reception ==
Museum Villa received coverage in several Dutch national newspapers and art publications. NRC Handelsblad described the museum as an institution in which “each artist is given an individual room,” emphasizing the museum’s focus on visitor experience.

De Volkskrant reviewed one of the museum’s exhibitions and discussed its use of spatial and experiential strategies in contemporary art presentation.
