= Dutch Museum Association =

- Native name: Museumvereniging
- Industry: arts and culture; heritage; museums
- Founded: 1926
- Headquarters: Rapenburgerstraat 123, Amsterdam, Netherlands
- Area served: Netherlands
- Products: Museumkaart
- Number of employees: 27 (2026)
- Website: www.museumvereniging.nl/Contact/English.aspx

The Dutch Museum Association (Dutch: De Museumvereniging) is an association of museums in the Netherlands. Over five hundred museums are affiliated with the association.

== History ==
In 1926, the Museumvereniging was established as a meeting of museum directors in the Netherlands. In 2003, the Museumkaart foundation was integrated into the Dutch Museum Association organisation. In 2006, the Museumvereniging became an umbrella organisation for the Dutch museums organised into ten subject-specific areas. The Association of National Museums, for example, is included within the Museumvereniging umbrella. Irene Asscher-Vonk is the first president of the Museumvereniging. On February 27, 2026—the year marking the association's centenary—the Museum Association received the designation 'Royal'. The designation was presented to Vera Carasso, Director of the Museum Association and the Museum Card Foundation, by Mr. J.C.J. (Jelle) Beemsterboer, Acting King's Commissioner for the province of North Holland.

== Activities ==
De Museumvereniging focuses on advocacy and professional development of its members and promotes museum visits. It facilitates the Stichting Museumregister Nederland ('the Dutch Museum Register'), which facilitates recognition of the status of these museums. The Dutch Museum Association also facilitates the Ethical Code Commission for Museums. Additionally, the Dutch Museum Association is responsible for the Foundation of the Museumkaart. Approximately 400 of the 500 Dutch Museum Association members are participants in the Museumkaart Foundation, meaning that they accept the Museumkaart. The Dutch Museum Association also organises the Dutch Museumweekend.
