= International Institute of Social History =

Historical Research Institute in Amsterdam

- Internationaal Instituut voor Sociale Geschiedenis

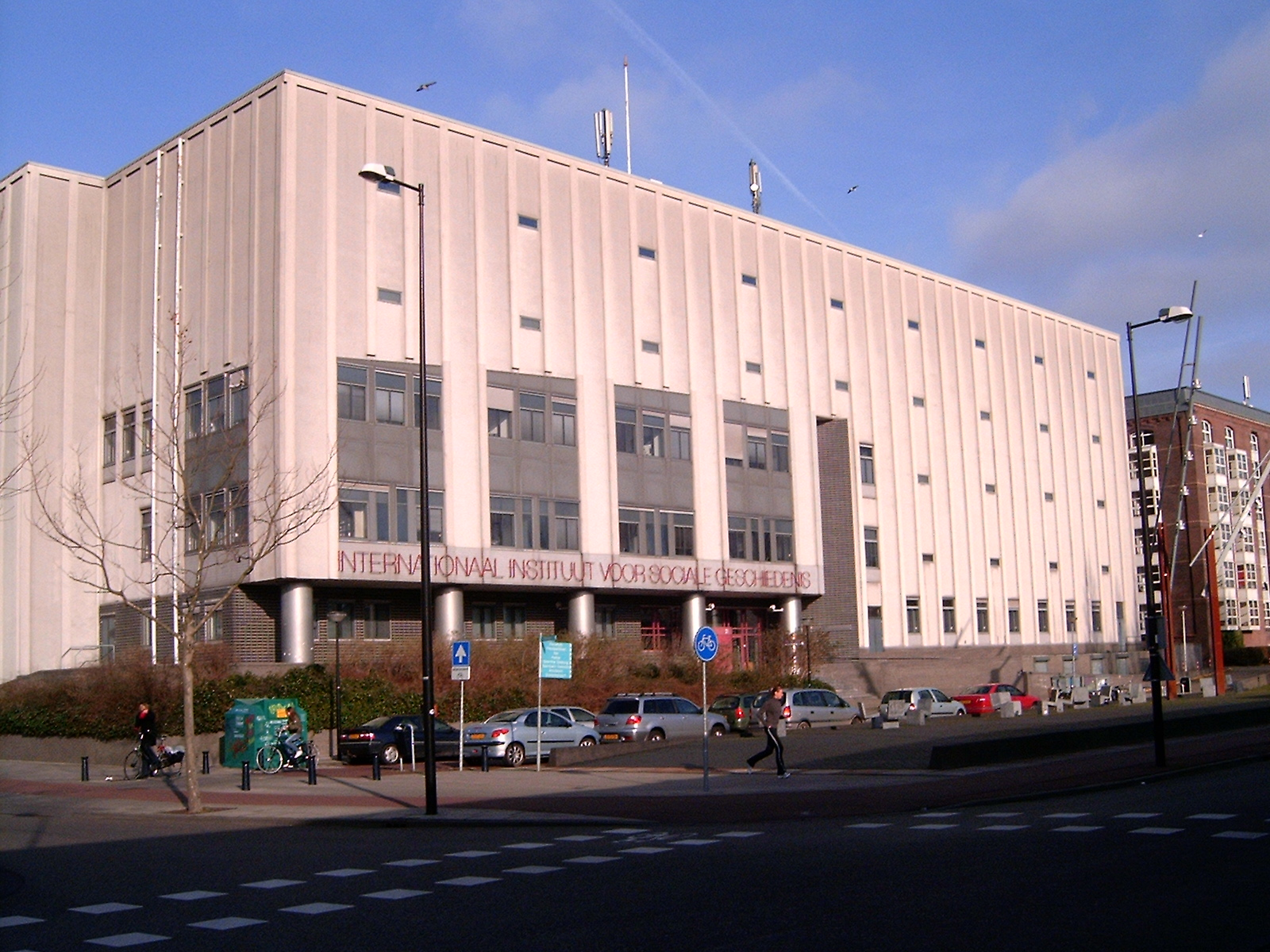
- Abbreviation: IISH/IISG
- Website: iisg.amsterdam

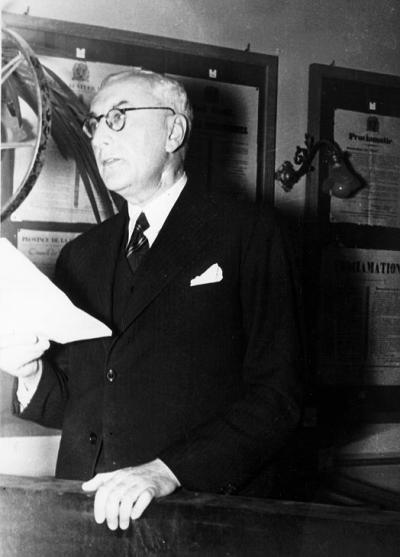
Posthumus, IISH founder and director (1937–1952)

The International Institute of Social History (IISH; Dutch: Internationaal Instituut voor Sociale Geschiedenis, IISG) is one of the largest archives of labor and social history in the world. Located in Amsterdam, its one million volumes and 5,445 archival collections include the papers of major figures and institutions in radical leftist thought. The IISH was founded in 1935 by Nicolaas Posthumus as an independent scientific institute. It is part of the Royal Netherlands Academy of Arts and Sciences.

== Collections ==
The International Institute of Social History specializes in international labor and social history, including that of the Netherlands. As of 2000, it holds one million volumes, 80,000 audiovisual items, 2,400 serials, three million digital files, and 30,000 linear feet of manuscripts across 5,445 collections. Among the latter are institutional collections from Amnesty International, Confederación Nacional del Trabajo and Federación Anarquista Ibérica, the European Trade Union Confederation, Freedom Press, Greenpeace International, the International Confederation of Free Trade Unions, Russian Socialist Revolutionary Party, Socialist International, and the personal papers of Emma Goldman, Karl Marx, Max Nettlau, Lev Trotsky, Karl Kautsky, Ernest Mandel, and Sylvia Pankhurst. The institute is the foremost repository of anarchist documents in the world.

== History ==
Nicolaas Posthumus, a socialist and first chair appointment in economic history in the Netherlands, founded the International Institute of Social History in 1935. To examine how labour relations develop over time, IISG collected archives from all over the world. During the first years Posthumus succeeded in obtaining many papers from anarchists (Bakunin manuscripts), other socialist and social democratic and Marxist movements from Germany and Russia.

Before the Germans invaded the Netherlands in May 1940, Posthumus was able to move the most valuable archives to London. During the war, most remaining IISG archives were transported to Nazi Germany between June 1942 and September 1944 by agents of the Reichsleiter Rosenberg Taskforce led by Eberhard Kautter. They were not destroyed, but stored for eventual inclusion in the Advanced School of the NSDAP. Most of the papers were rediscovered in Hannover in 1946, and some other parts were later found in archives in Moscow in 1991, and returned to Amsterdam.

In 1989 the International Institute of Social History moved to new premises: an old warehouse at the Cruquiusweg in the eastern part of Amsterdam. This building also housed the Press Museum but in 2017 that museum became a part of the Dutch Institute for Image and Sound (Nederlands Instituut voor Beeld en Geluid) in Hilversum.

IISG hosts part of the IHLIA LGBT Heritage collection (LGBT Archives).

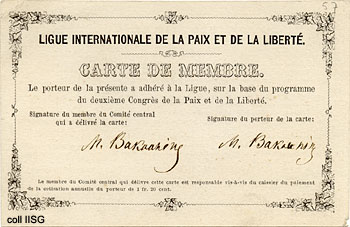
Bakunin Archives (IISG)

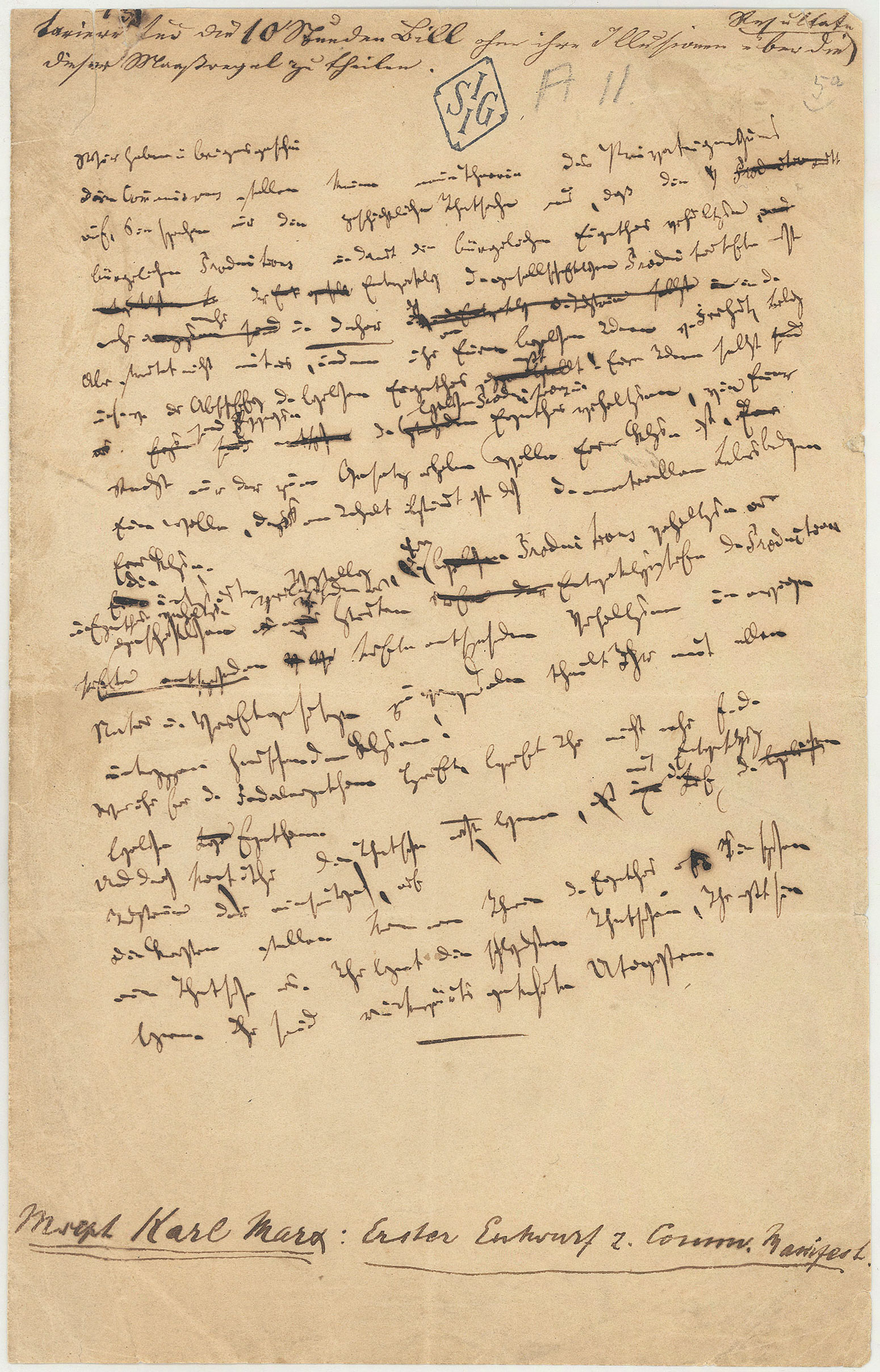
Communist Manifesto (Marx)

== See also ==
- Swiss Social Archives in Zurich

== Bibliography ==
- Kloosterman, Jaap (2001). "International Institute of Social History". In Stam, David H. (ed.). International Dictionary of Library Histories. Chicago: Fitzroy Dearborn. pp. 373–375. ISBN 978-1-57958-244-9.
