= Electric Ladyland (museum) =

- Electric Ladyland
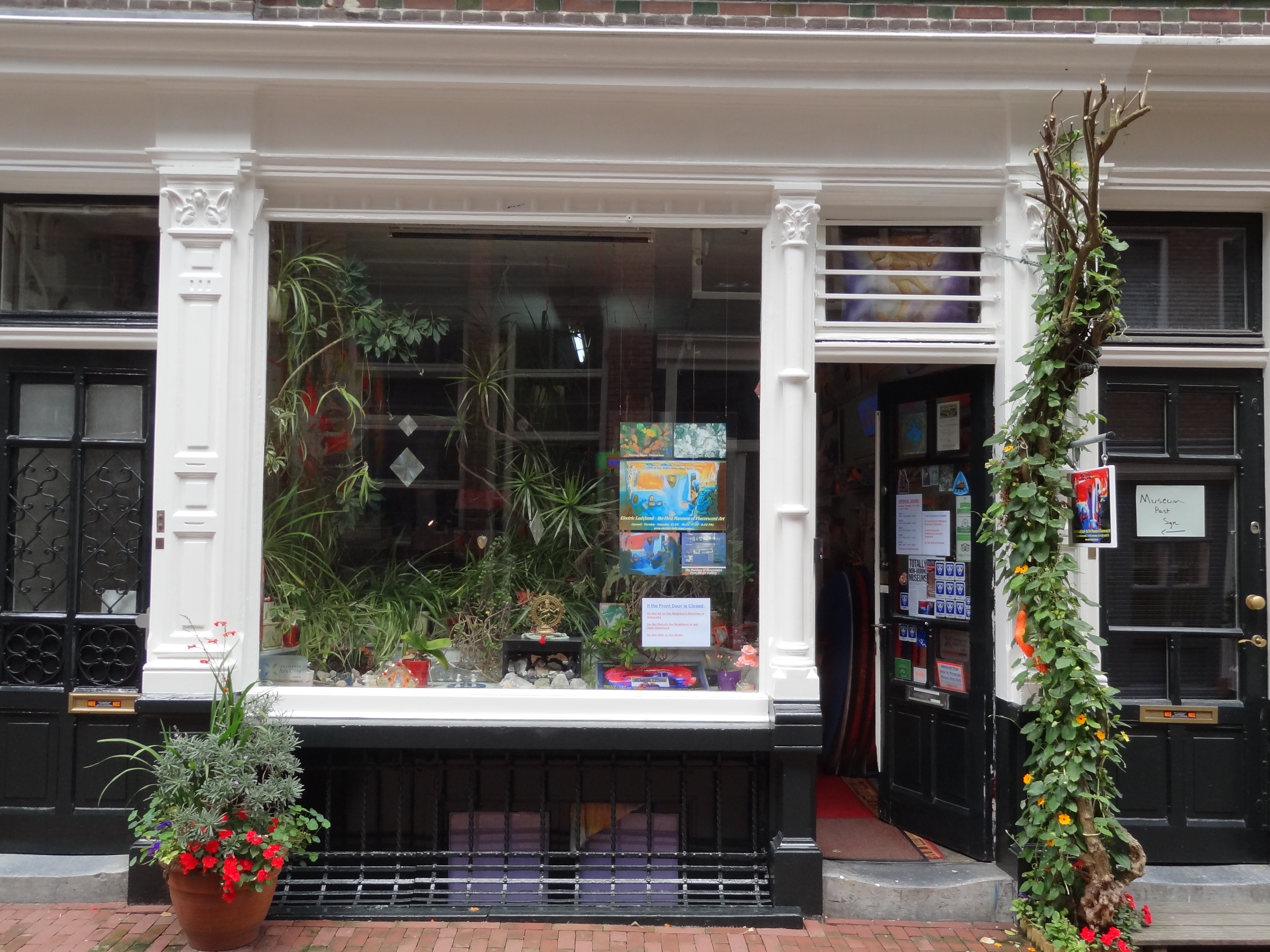
- Electric Ladyland museum in 2016

- Location of the museum in the city of Amsterdam
- Established: 1999
- Location: Tweede Leliedwarsstraat 5, 1015 TB Amsterdam, Netherlands
- Coordinates: 52°22′32″N 4°52′51″E
- Founder: Nick Padalino
- Website: electric-lady-land.com

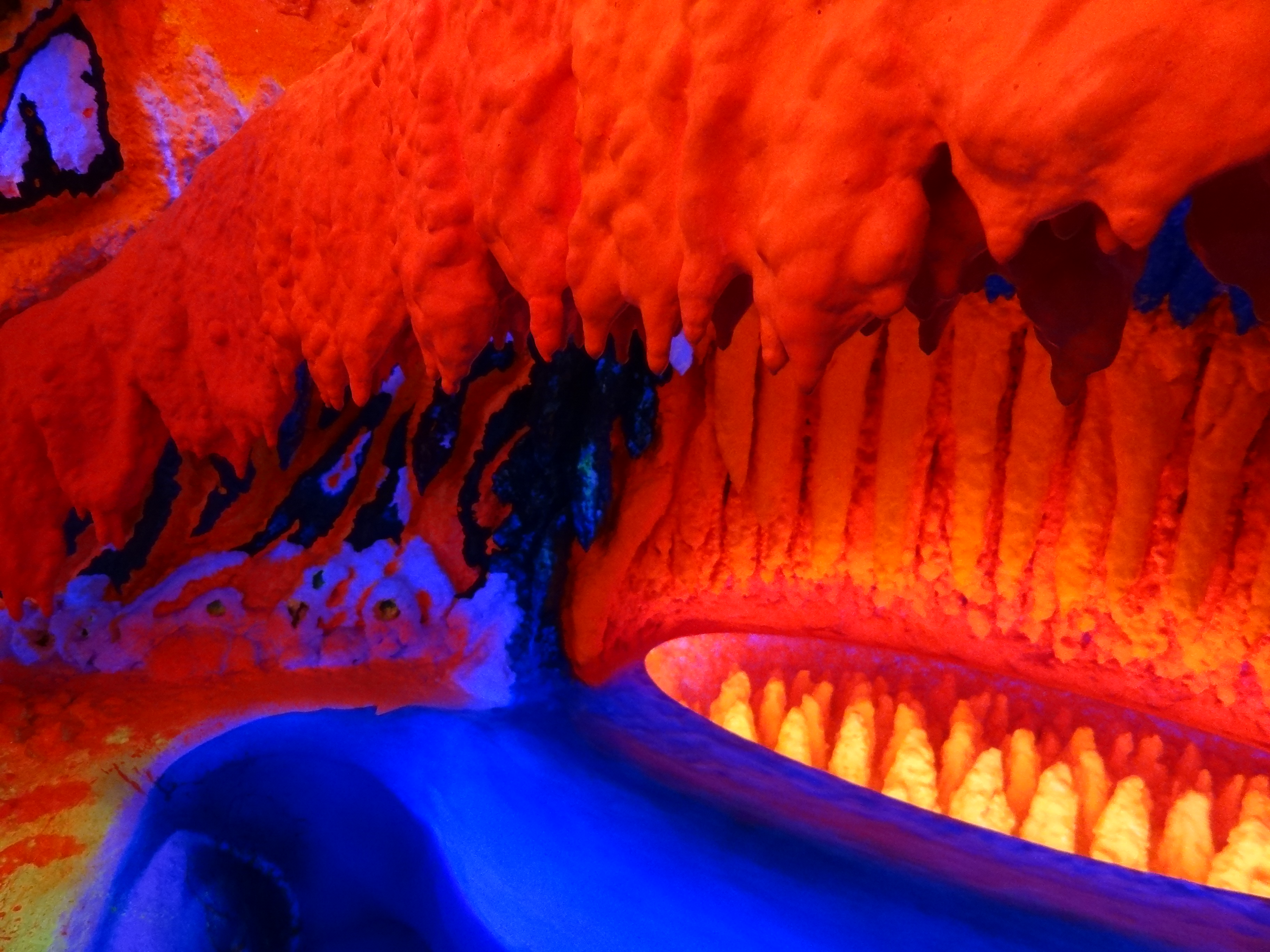
Fluorescent sculpture

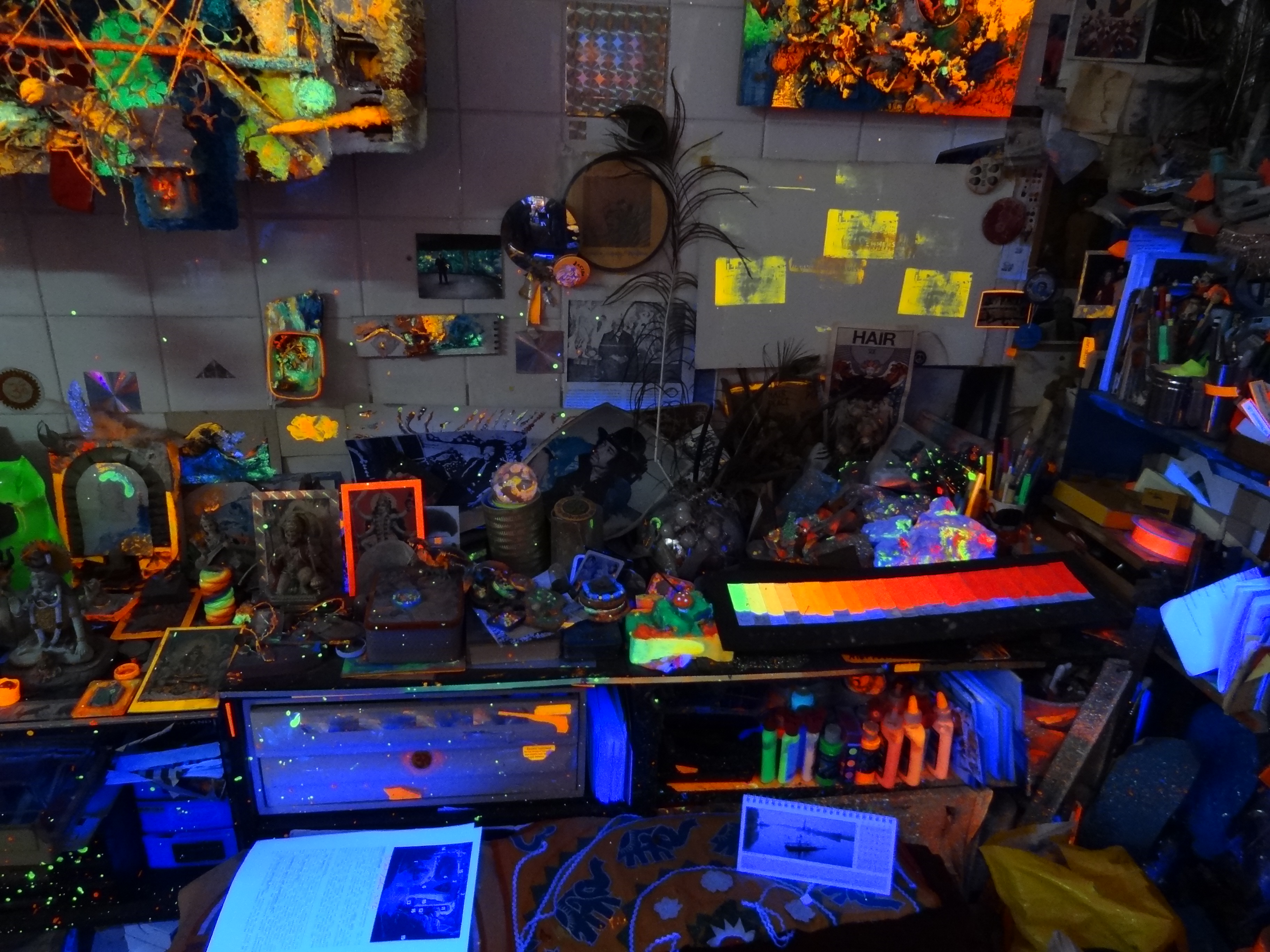
Fluorescent items

Electric Ladyland is a museum located in the Jordaan area of Amsterdam, Netherlands. It is devoted to presenting art, minerals, and manufactured items that fluoresce under ultraviolet light. It opened on April 19, 1999 and was the first museum devoted to fluorescence.
