= Press Museum =

- Persmuseum
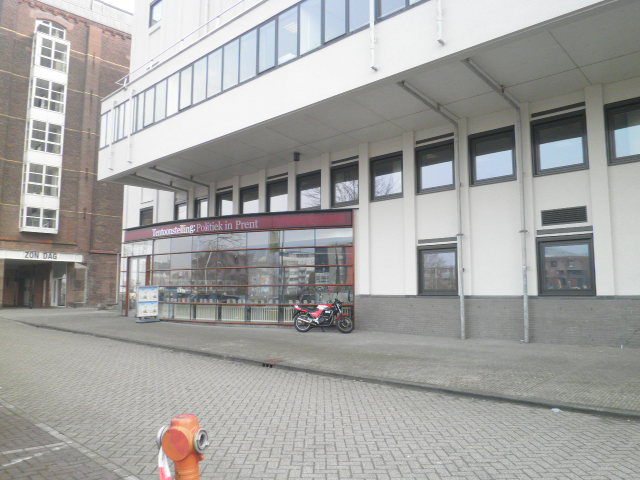
- Museum in 2013

- Location in Amsterdam
- Established: 1902
- Location: Zeeburgerkade 10; Amsterdam, Netherlands
- Coordinates: 52.3692°N 4.9398°E
- Type: Heritage museum
- Visitors: 7,831 (2014)
- Director
- Website: persmuseum.nl

The Press Museum (Dutch: Persmuseum) is a museum of journalistic heritage in Amsterdam, Netherlands, that became part of the Netherlands Institute for Sound and Vision in 2017.

== History ==
The museum (Dutch: Persmuseum) was established in 1902.

In 1989, the collection of the museum was moved to the building of the International Institute of Social History in Amsterdam. Since 2001, the museum has its own permanent exhibition space at this location. In 2001, an exhibition space was opened.

== Permanent collection ==
The permanent collection has not changed since it opened in 2001. The museum has been collecting since 1902, and the collection dates back to 1610. The collection is divided into three major categories: magazines, political cartoons, and archives.

== Temporary exhibitions ==
The museum also displays temporary exhibitions. One of their latest was on Charlie Hebdo soon after the attack there.
