= Canal house =

House overlooking a canal

Two canal houses, called twins, both with neckgables on Keizersgracht, designed by H. Ruse

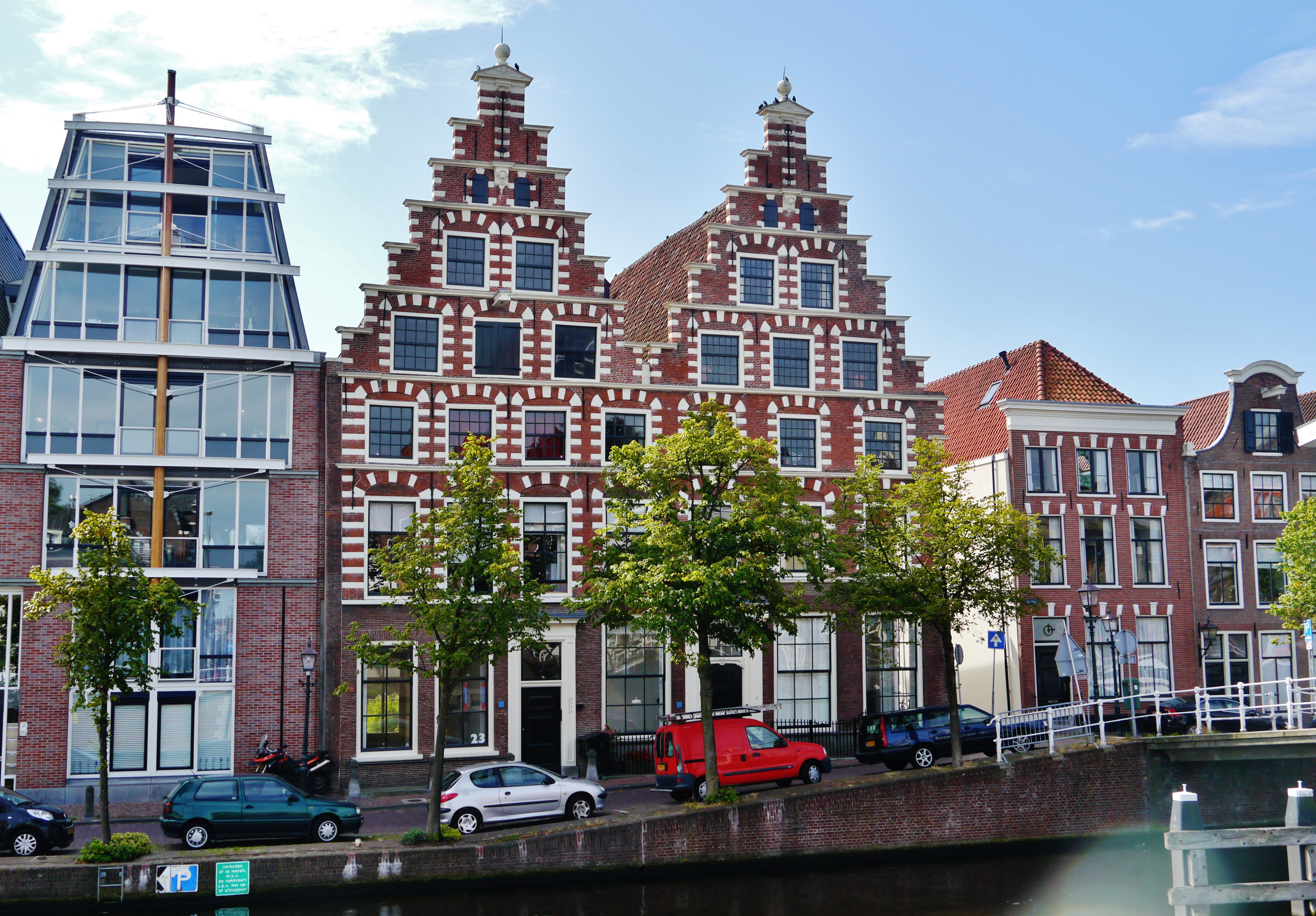
Canal houses in Haarlem

A canal house (Dutch: grachtenpand) is a (usually old) house overlooking a canal. These houses are often slim, high and deep. Canal houses usually had a basement and a loft and attic where trade goods could be stored. A special beam or pulley installation would be located in the attic to hoist up valuable goods, like spices, cotton, or heavier stuff like cocoa. In recent times, the pulleys are only used (albeit rarely) for moving furniture.

At the back of a canal house, there will usually be a back garden that runs either halfway or to the house behind. The garden would be laid out to the taste of the time and the financial position of the owner. At the bottom of the garden, there was sometimes a summerhouse where family and visitors could relax.

In the second half of the 17th century, there would sometimes be built a rear extension of the building and linked by a passage to the front house. The courtyard ensured light. It could be used for many purposes, and during World War II Anne Frank and her family were using the back house as a hiding place.

When the first owner of the house had more houses built by the same carpenter or contractor and using the same or mirrored design these are called twin or triplet houses. There are even sets of four or five identically designed houses. In those cases, the houses will be smaller than a normal house (as three houses were built on two land lot). The width of a canal house and the depth of its garden varies a lot. (This is because the land lots in the 17th century started from 18 feet (an Amsterdam foot being 28.13 cm) but then went to 20, 22, 24 and 26 feet.)

Along the canals in Amsterdam are also double wide houses, especially along the Herengracht. These mansions were built on two land plots, a back house was usually not needed. At Herengracht 386, the museum Het Grachtenhuis (The Canal House) is located, which tells the story of the Amsterdam canal belt.

If one also bought the lots behind those houses and built a carriage house and or warehouses, it was sometimes referred to as a "city palace". Warehouses were much deeper than houses, sometimes 40m. As trading and transport patterns changed, the warehouses lost their original function. After World War II many have been turned into living accommodations.

Because of the danger of flooding in the early 18th century the front door is sometimes higher up and only accessible via stairs. The floor of the main storey lies about seven to nine steps above street level. Many stoops disappeared in the 19th century when entrances were moved to the basement.

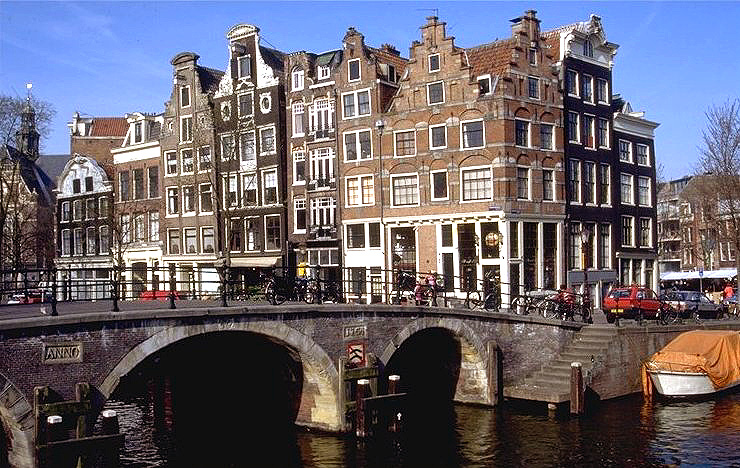
Prinsengracht canal, Amsterdam

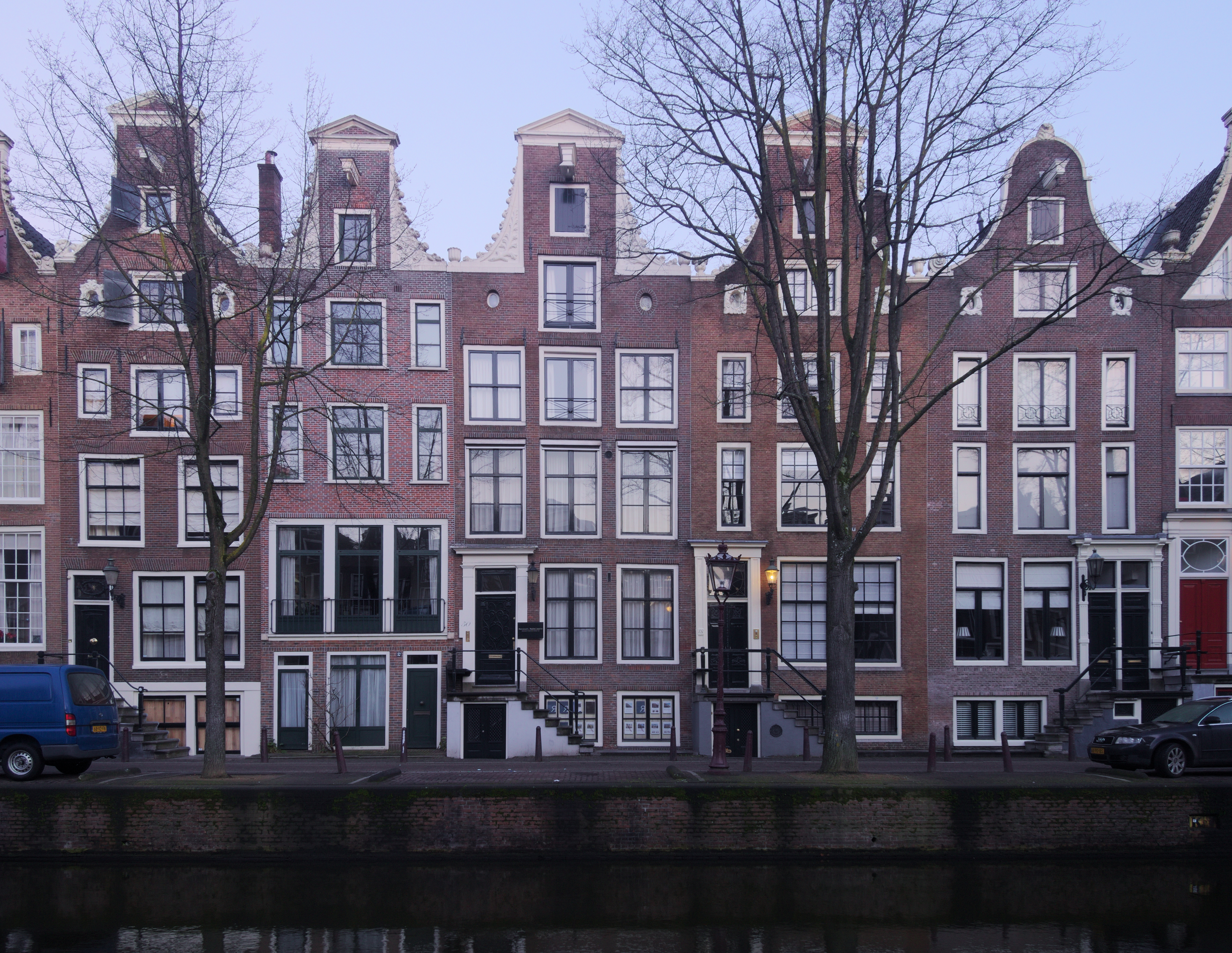
Leidsegracht canal, Amsterdam

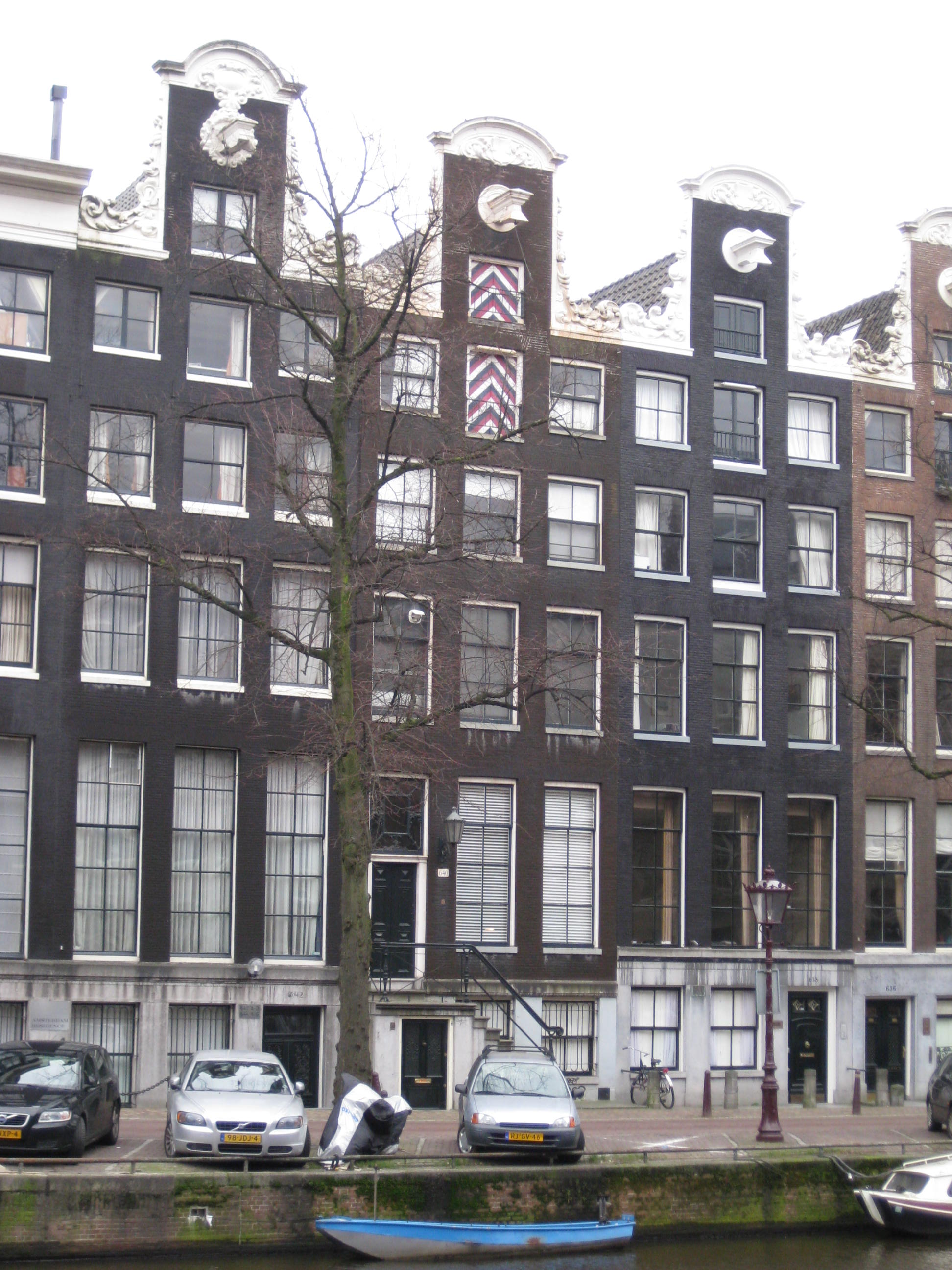
Keizersgracht canal, Amsterdam

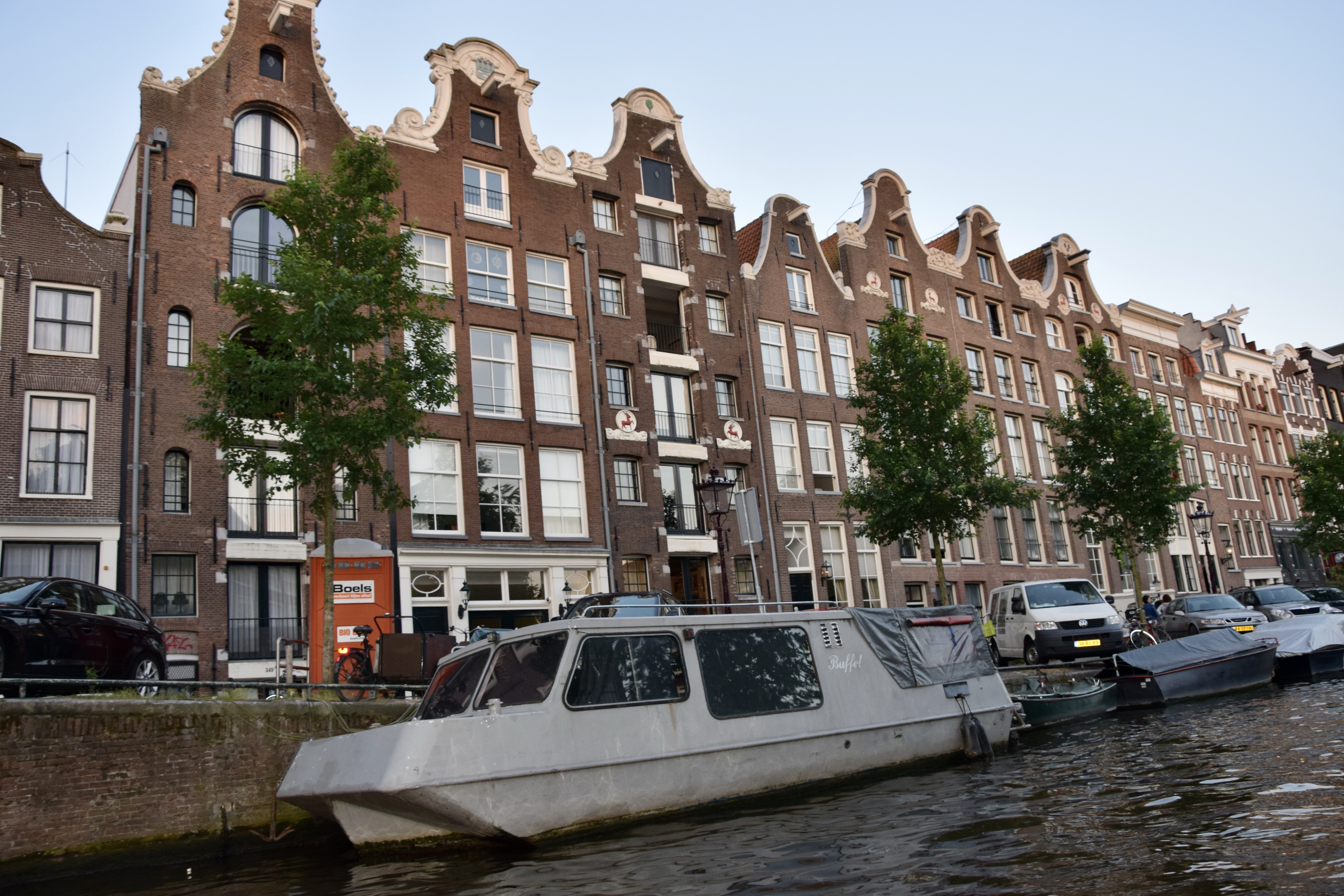
Canal houses, Prinsengracht

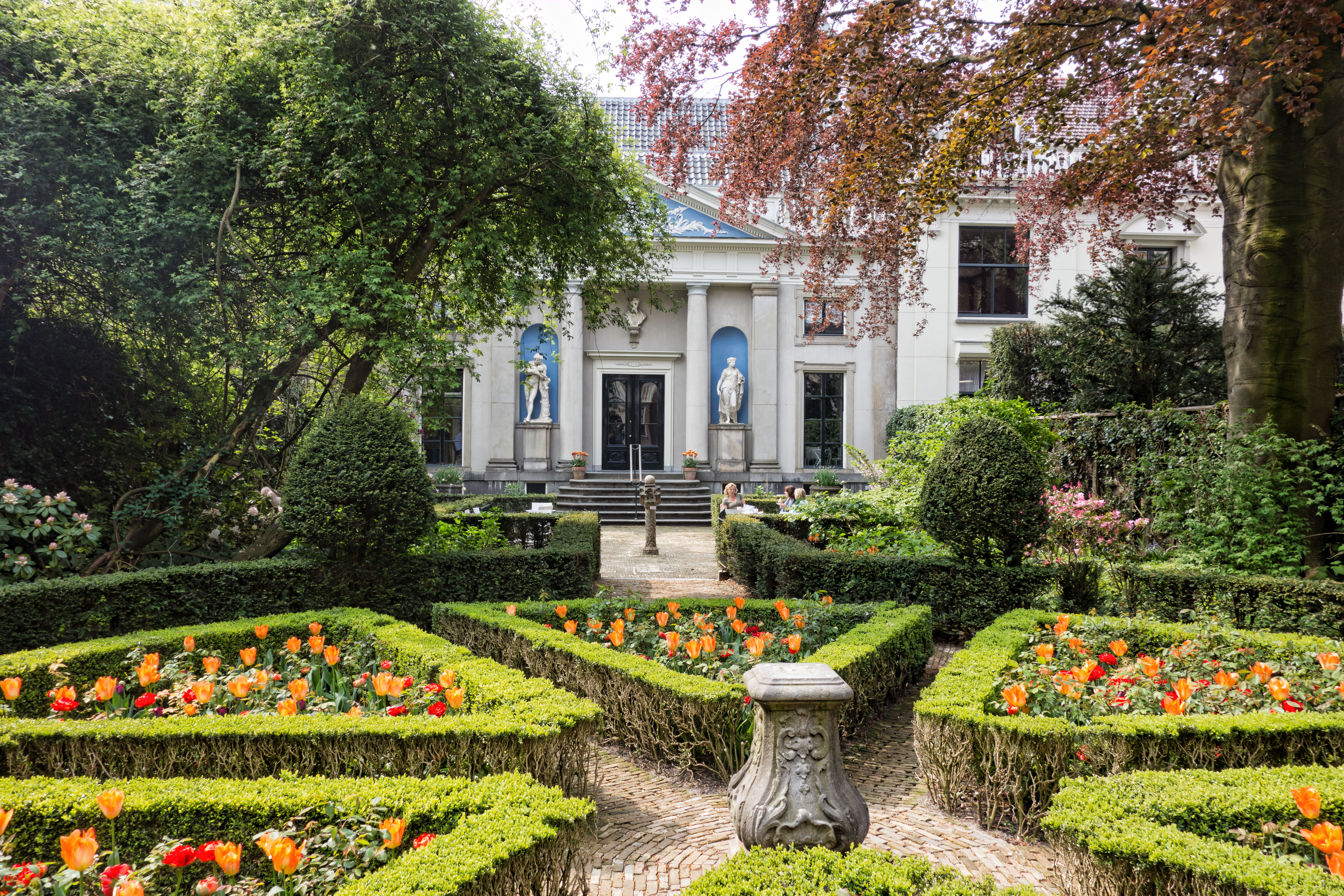
Museum Van Loon gardens

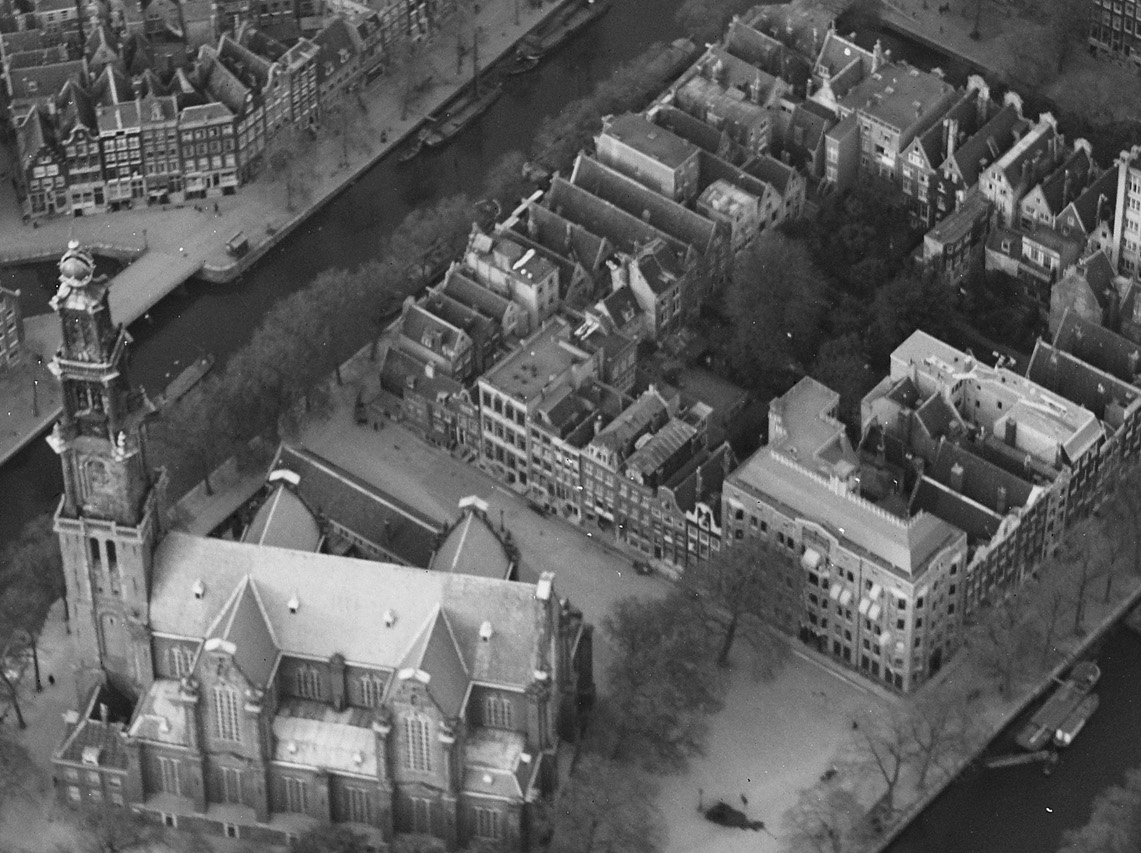
Aerial photograph of Westerkerk and Anne Frank House

== See also ==
- Huis met de Hoofden
- Keizersgracht 453
- Museum Geelvinck-Hinlopen
- Museum Willet-Holthuysen
- Ons' Lieve Heer op Solder
- Trippenhuis
- 3D Print Canal House

== Sources ==
- Building Amsterdam. (1994) Written and illustrated by Herman Janse. ISBN 90-216-7131-X
- Amsterdamse Grachtengids (1978) by Tim Kilian, Marieke van der Zeijden en Hans Tulleners.
