= Bijbels Museum =

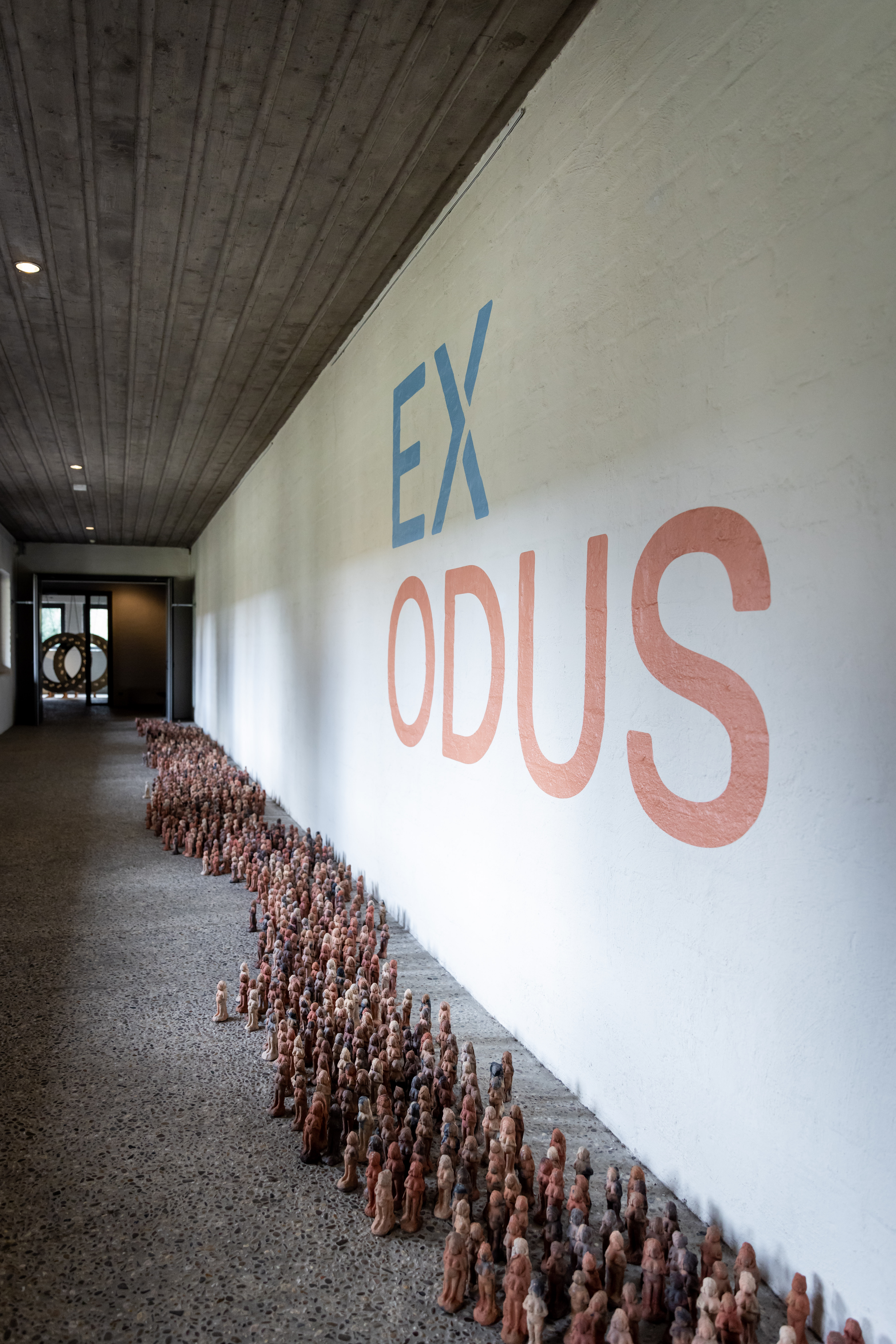
Entrance of the exhibition EXODUS in Buitenplaats Doornburgh. Which was held from March to September 2023. Photo by Lize Kraan.

The Bijbels Museum ("Biblical Museum") is a nomadic museum that was, up until July 2020, located in the Cromhouthuizen on the Herengracht in Amsterdam. Since then, the Biblical Museum produces travelling exhibitions that are centered around Biblical stories and themes. These Biblical stories and themes function as a reference point and inspiration for the travelling exhibition. These exhibitions often link to other religions and religious movements. The Biblical Museum aims to tell stories that are inspiring and reflect on meaning making. The Biblical Museum is a museum for everyone, for both believers and non-believers.

The office of the Biblical Museum is now located at the Corvershof in Amsterdam. The exhibitions can be viewed at different locations in Amsterdam and the Netherlands.

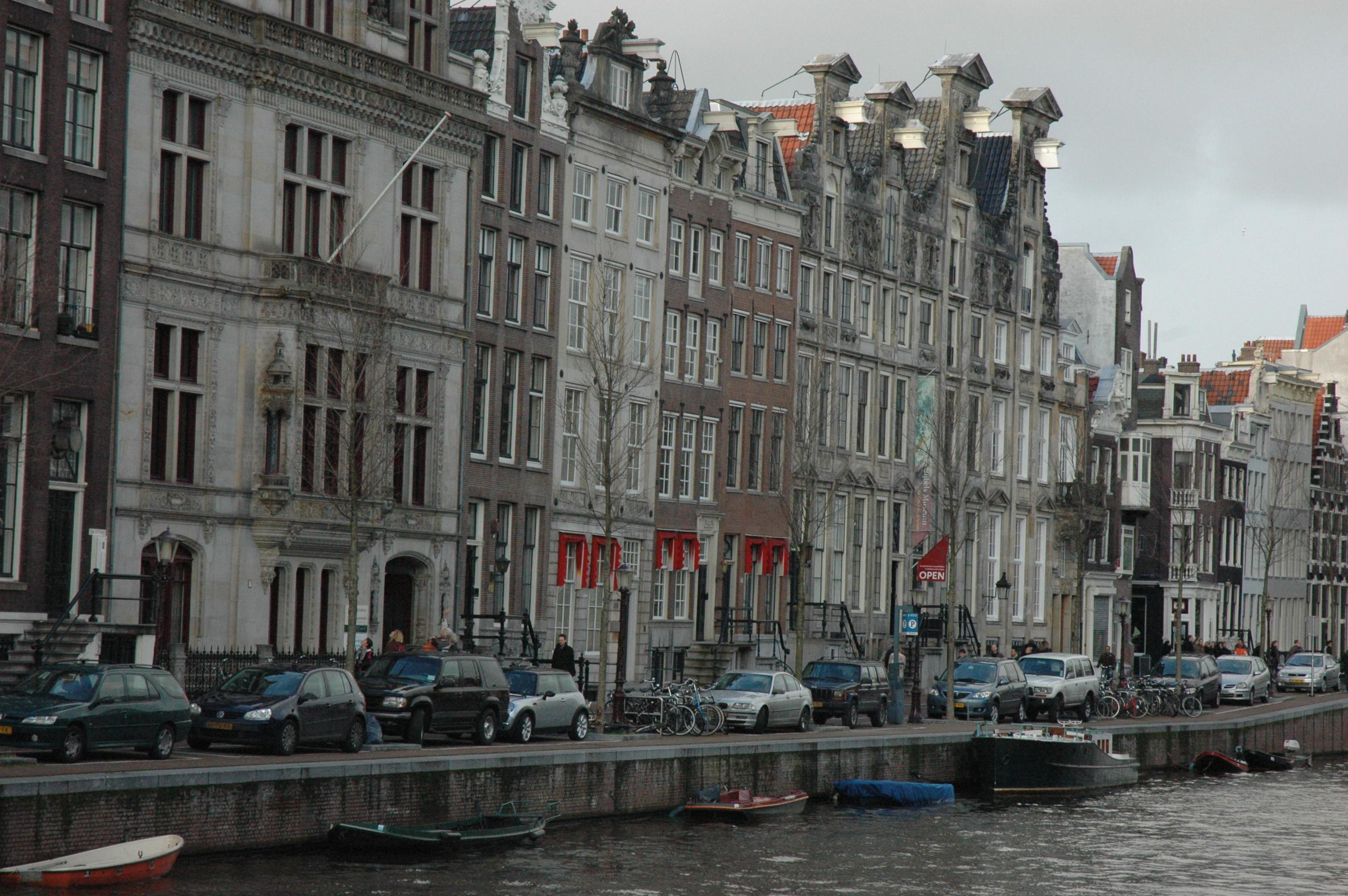
Former location of the Bijbels Museum, Cromhouthuizen at the Herengracht Amsterdam

In 2020, the collection of the Biblical Museum has been transferred to other museums and heritage institutions. The collection of Rev. Leendert Schouten, including the nineteenth-century models of the Tabernacle and the Temple Mount in Jerusalem has been handed over to Museum Catharijneconvent in Utrecht. The collection of special Bibles has been transferred to the special collection of the Vrije Universiteit in Amsterdam. The special collection also has a loan on the Van Santen Bijbel.

== History: Becoming a Nomadic Museum ==
The museum grew out of the collection of 19th-century reverent Leendert Schouten, who had built the model of the Tabernacle and collected a lot of materials that originated from the time and region of the Bible. The Biblical Museum was located in the upper floors of the two middle Cromhout houses from 1975 to 2020.

The Biblical Museum was robbed in the fall of 2007. Nine objects disappeared from a display case, including bronze figurines, heart carabs and a Roman coin. Seven objects surfaced two years later at Christie's auction house in New York.

In 2012, the museum participated in Amsterdam Heritage Museums, a collective promotion effort. The Amsterdam Fund for the Arts decided in 2016 that the Bijbels Museum lost its grant for the period 2017–2020. Until then, it had received more than 200,000 euros annually. The quality of the plans submitted was judged insufficient. In May 2018, the museum decided to dispose of its collection because there was too little money for maintenance and it wanted to fulfill its mission in a different way, to start telling stories in a new way. The change in direction was completed with the team's move to the Corvershof in Amsterdam and the closure as of July 1, 2020 of the permanent presentation on the Herengracht. Since then, the Biblical Museum became a nomadic museum with travelling exhibitions throughout Amsterdam and the Netherlands.

== Former Collection ==
The former collection of the Biblical Museum included the first printed Bible in the Netherlands, the so-called Delft Bible from 1477. It also included the first print of the Statenvertaling from 1673. The Biblical Museum had several models on permanent display: a model of the Temple of Salomon, of the Temple of Herod and a 19th-century model of the Tabernacle. The collection also entailed several archeological findings (mostly from the first century B.C.E. and the first century C.E.), religious objects and a number of prints. Former curator of the Biblical Museum Hermine Pool wrote extensively about the history of the Biblical Museum in: Soli Deo Gloria: Het Bijbels Museum van ds. Leendert Schouten (1828-1905) als getuigenis van de profetische en historische waarheid van de Bijbel: Een dubbelbiografie (2021).

== Travelling exhibitions ==
Since 2018 the Biblical Museum has chosen a new direction. Examples of this new direction (for a larger public, focus on modern art and travelling exhibitions) are Zondvloed nu (The Flood now), Verhalen van hoop (Stories of Hope), Zie mij. De bijbel in 609 foto's (See me. The bible in 609 photographs) and Dit is mijn verhaal. Jongeren over geloof, hoop en inspiratie (This is my story. Youth on faith, hope and inspiration).

In October - December 2020 the Biblical Museum held an exhibition in the Westerkerk in Amsterdam called NIEUWE AARDE: 12 visioenen (NEW EARTH: 12 visions). This exhibition was a collaboration between the Biblical Museum, The Turn Club and the Westerkerk. The exhibition was an open call for artistic representations of visions for a new earth.

In July - September 2021 the Biblical Museum held an exhibition in Escher in het Paleis and the Kloosterkerk in The Hague called Tijd en Eeuwigheid. Poëzie in beeld en woord (Time and Eternity. Poetry in image and word). This exhibition was also on display in Museum Krona, Uden (October 2021 - January 2022), Museum Klooster Ter Apel (February - May 2022) and CIRCL Amsterdam (May - July 2022).

In January - April 2023 the Biblical Museum held an exhibition in Fotogalerie de Gang Haarlem called Eva, Sara en Hanna. Vrouwen van de wereld (Eve, Sarah and Hannah. Women of the World). This exhibition is also on display in de Openbare Bibliotheek Amsterdam Oosterdok (September - December 2023).

In March - September 2023 the Biblical Museum held an exhibition in Buitenplaats Doornburgh called EXODUS. Hedendaagse kunst, urgente verhalen (EXODUS. Contemporary art, urgent stories). This exhibition was a collaboration between the Biblical Museum and Buitenplaats Doornburgh. It was an open call centered around the concept of EXODUS. Out of 700 plus reactions, 28 artists were chosen.
