= Amsterdam Heritage Museums =

Museum foundation in Amsterdam, the Netherlands

Amsterdam Heritage Museums was an initiative of four museums in Amsterdam to collectively promote the city's heritage museums. Participating museums were: the Amsterdam Museum, Museum Willet-Holthuysen, Museum Ons’ Lieve Heer Op Solder, and the Biblical Museum. The foundation was officially founded in 2014.

The foundation started in 2010 when Paul Spies, director of the Amsterdam Museum, and Judikje Kiers of the Biblical Museum agreed on a partnership. The collaboration waned when the funding proposal for the period 2017-2020 was unsuccessful.
