= Cromhouthuizen =

Group of canal houses in Amsterdam

Coordinates: 52°22′07″N 4°53′11″E

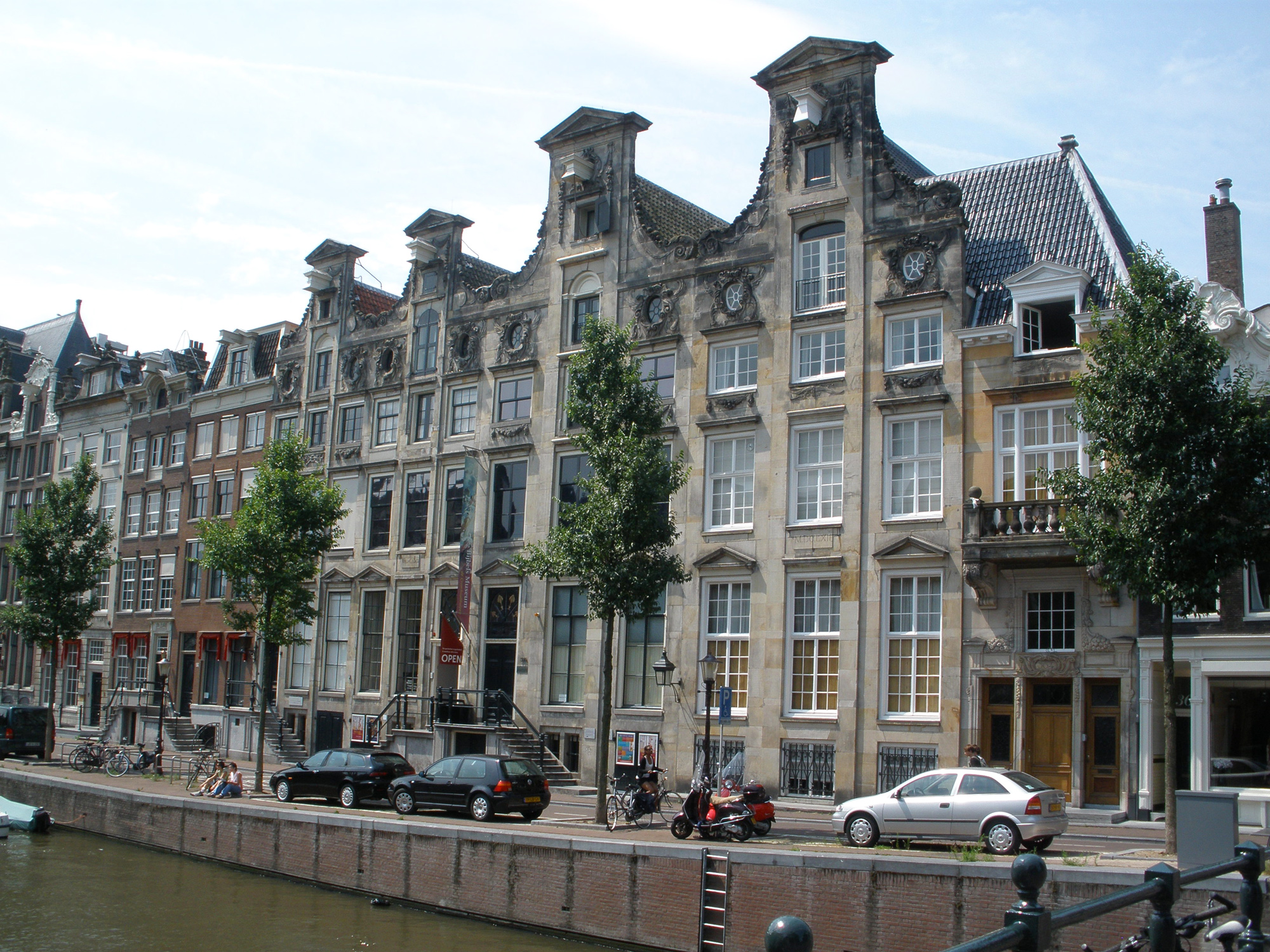
The Cromhout Houses in 2008

Cromhouthuizen (English: Cromhout Houses) consists of four consecutive canal houses on Herengracht in Amsterdam, Netherlands. The houses are located between Huidenstraat and the canal Herengracht, with house numbers 362–364, 366, 368, and 370.

The houses were designed by Amsterdam architect Philips Vingboons in the style of Dutch Classicism. They were built between 1660 and 1662 for the merchant Jacob Cromhout (1608–1669). Jacob Cromhout and his family lived in the 366 house.

Since 1970, the buildings have been protected as state monuments (Rijksmonumenten). The Biblical Museum is located at 366 and 368, since 1975.
