= Boekman Foundation =

Cultural research foundation

Boekman Foundation / Boekmanstichting
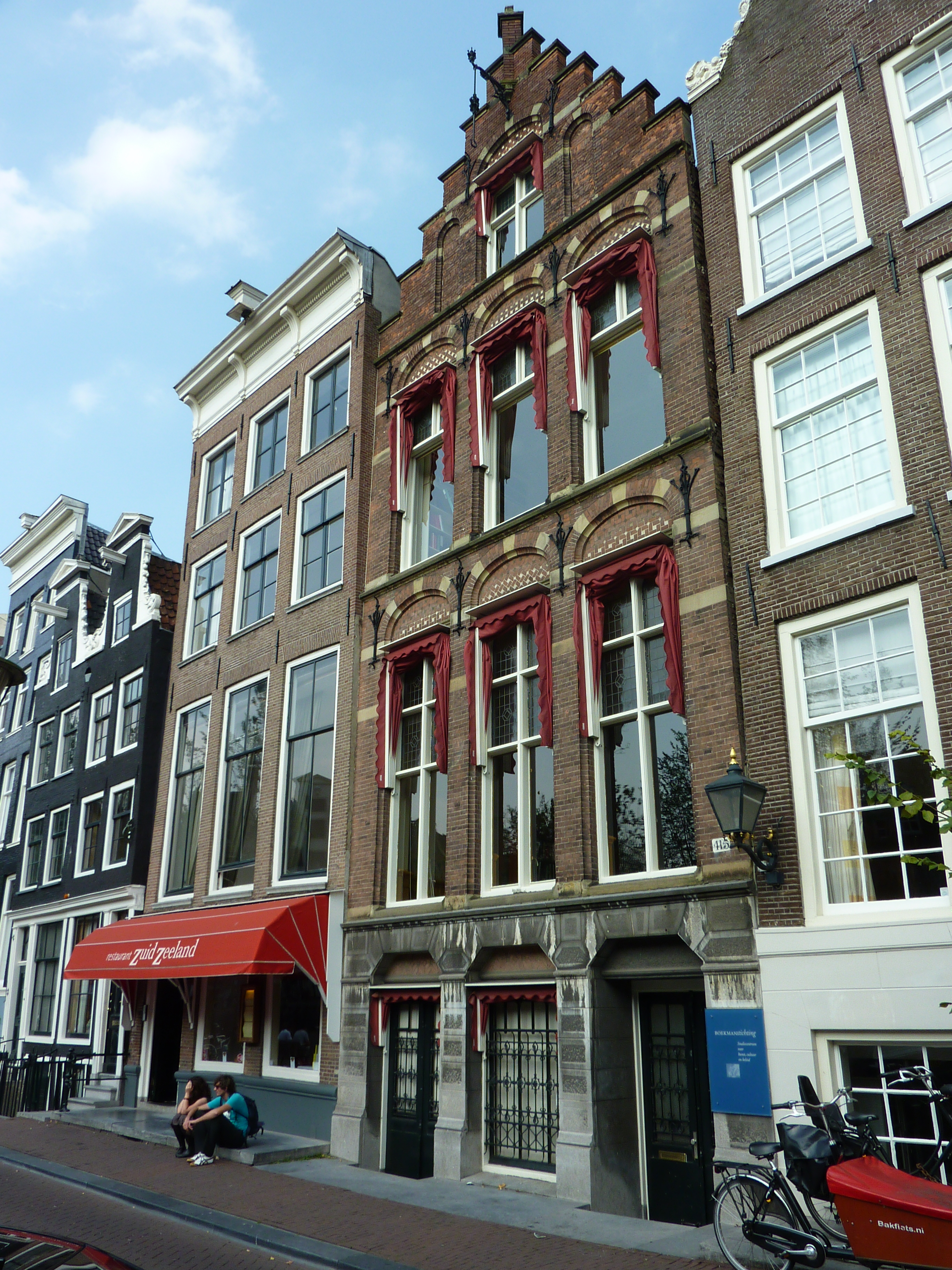
- Boekman Foundation Institute for arts, culture and related policy
- Named after: Emanuel Boekman (1889–1940)
- Formation: December 9, 1963; 62 years ago
- Founder: Jan Kassies (1920–1995)
- Type: Non-profit
- Headquarters: Herengracht 415, 1017 BP
- Location: Amsterdam, The Netherlands
- Coordinates: 52.3675°N 4.8875°E
- Fields: Dutch arts and culture policy research
- Leader: Coen Teulings, Supervisory Board president (2024)
- Board of directors: Jan Jaap Knol (2024)
- Staff: 16 (2024)
- Website: http://www.boekman.nl

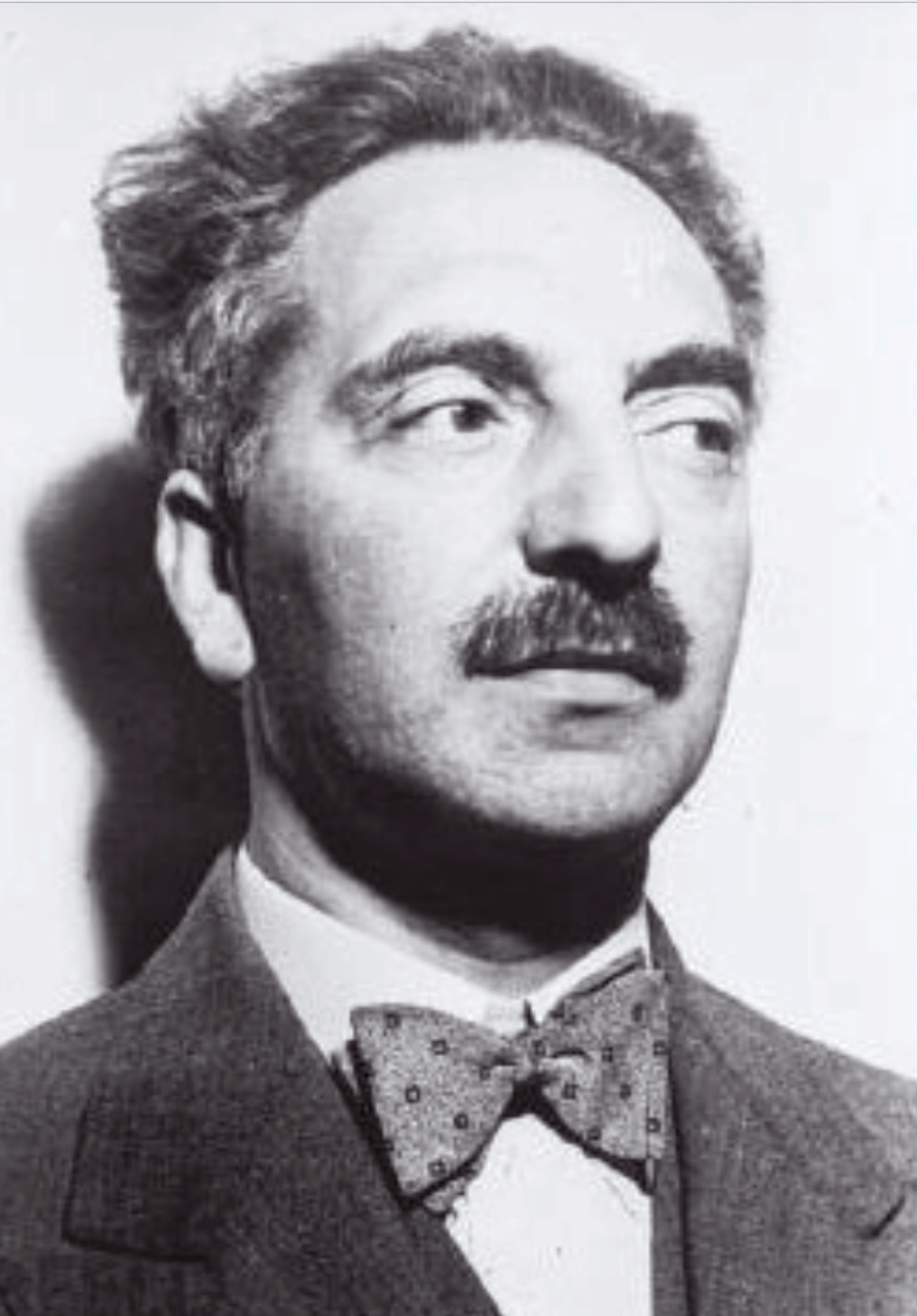
Emanuel Boekman (1889–1940), 1939.

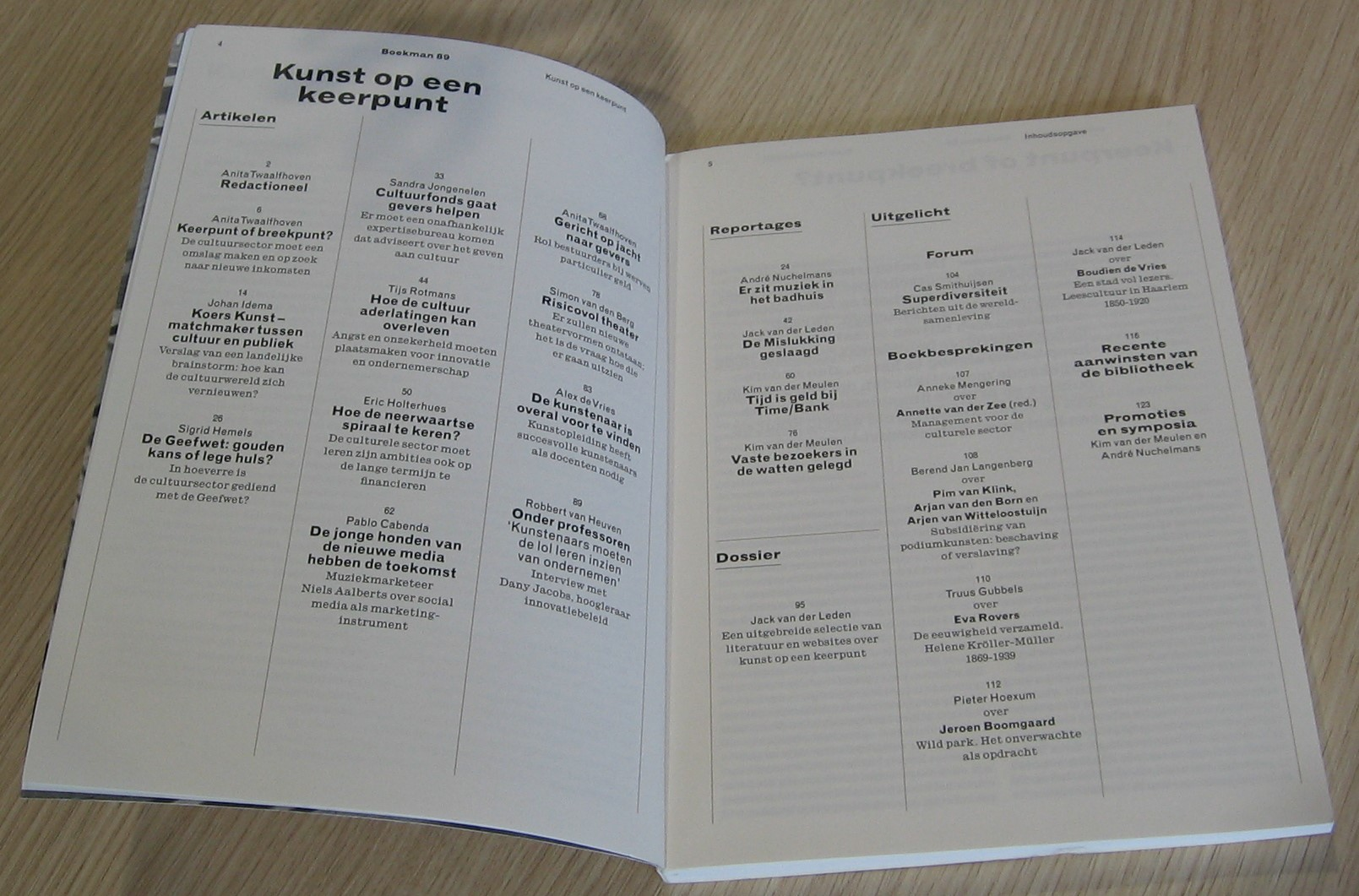
The quarterly journal Boekman 89. Magazine voor kunst, cultuur en beleid. Contents (in Dutch), winter 2011.

The Boekman Foundation Institute for arts, culture and related policy (Dutch: Boekmanstichting Kenniscentrum voor kunst, cultuur en beleid) is a research institute for Dutch arts and culture policy and practice. It was named after the Amsterdam SDAP politician and alderman Emanuel Boekman (1889–1940), who promoted public support for art and culture in his PhD thesis of 1939.

The Boekman Foundation was established in 1963 by Dutch cultural philosopher Jan Kassies (nl) and compiles and analyses statistical and other data on art and culture in the Netherlands for policy purposes. Its main periodical publications are the quarterly Boekman cultural magazine since 2003 and the annual national review report Culture Monitor (Cultuurmonitor) with an online dashboard resource. The Foundation hosts a free expertise database and library Kennisbank on art, culture and related policy with 85,000 titles in 2024.

== Boekman Dissertation Award ==
Since 2009, the Boekmanstichting and NWO Geesteswetenschappen (Dutch Research Council NWO, department of Humanities) award the triennial Boekman Dissertation Prize of €10.000 for the best Dutch PhD thesis on art, culture and society. The year following the award the Boekman journal devotes one of its editions to the winning dissertation. Because of the COVID-19 pandemic, the 2021 Prize was postponed to 2022.

No.	Award year	Recipient	PhD Thesis	University	Publication year
1	2009	Marijke de Valck	Film festivals. From European geopolitics to global cinephilia	University of Amsterdam	2006
2	2012	Amanda Brandellero	The art of being different: exploring diversity in the cultural industries	University of Amsterdam	2011
3	2015	Thijs E. Lijster	Critique of art. Walter Benjamin and Theodor W. Adorno on art and art criticism	University of Groningen	2012
4	2018	Hanka Otte	Binden of overbruggen? Over de relatie tussen kunst, cultuurbeleid en sociale cohesie (Binding or bridging? On the relationship between art, cultural policy and social cohesion)	University of Groningen	2015
5	2022	Yosha Wijngaarden	Spaces of co-working: situating innovation in the creative industries	Erasmus University Rotterdam	2019

== Gallery ==
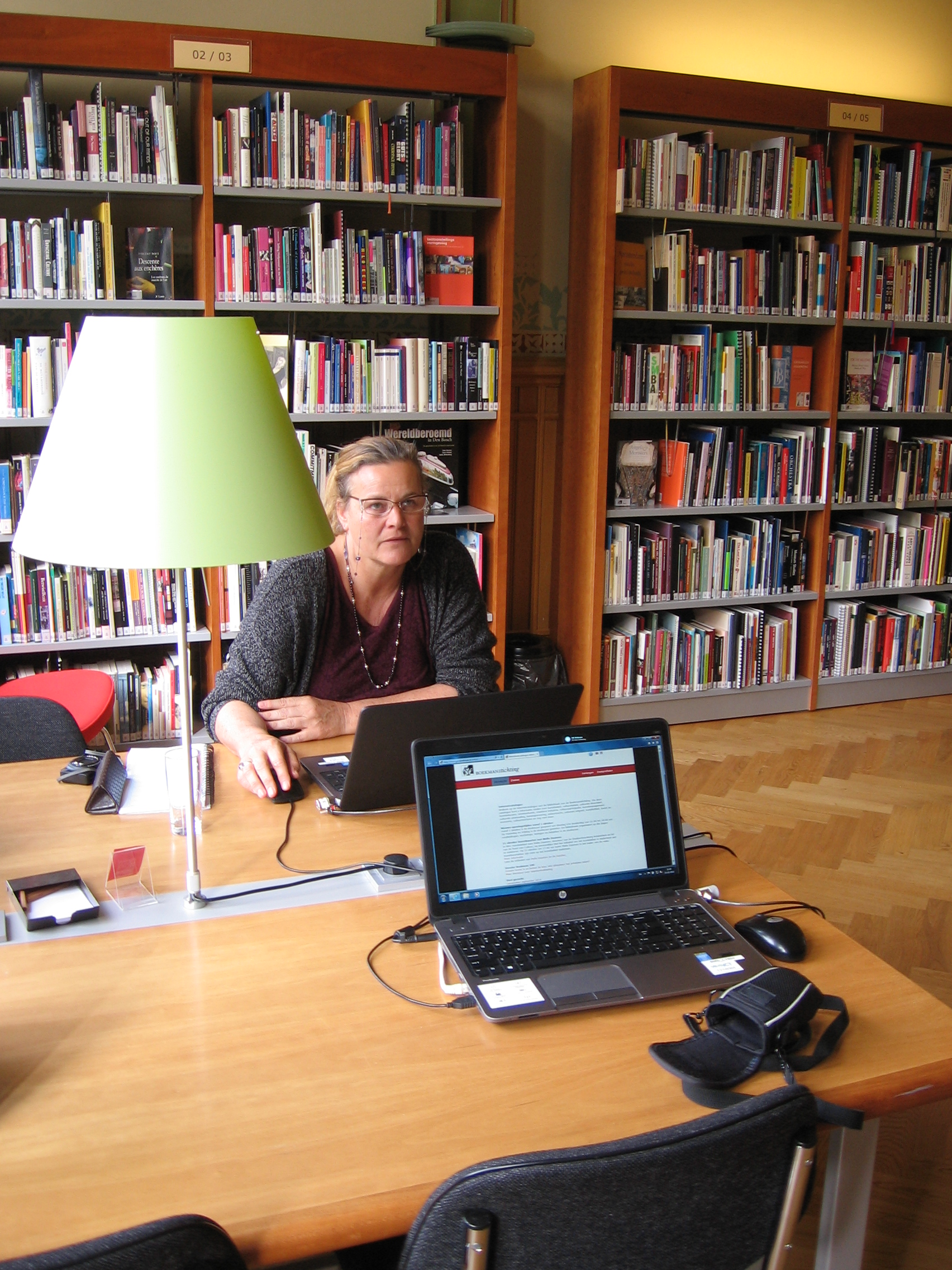
Boekman Library, 2014.

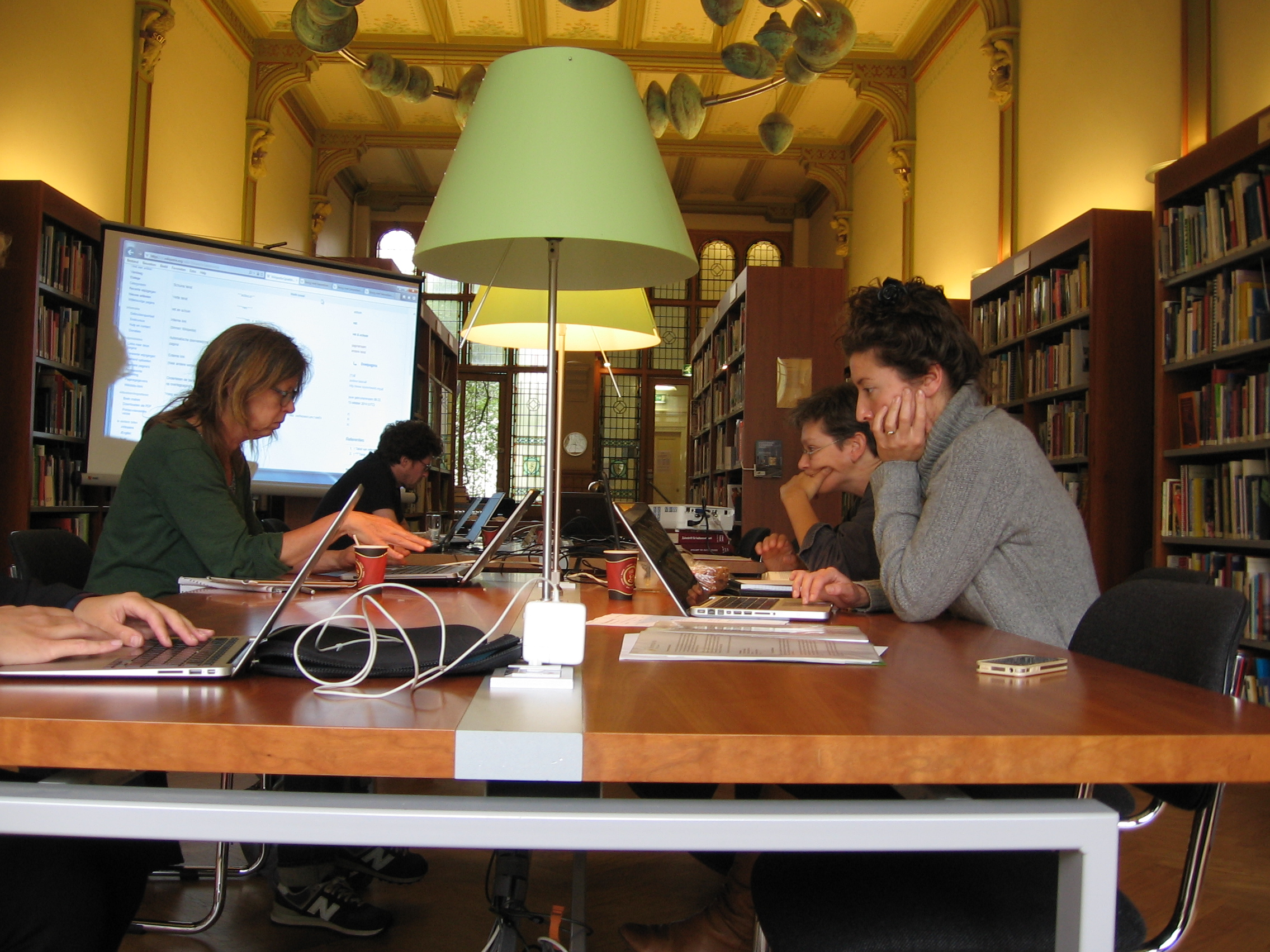
Boekman Library with a Wikipedia writing session, 2014.

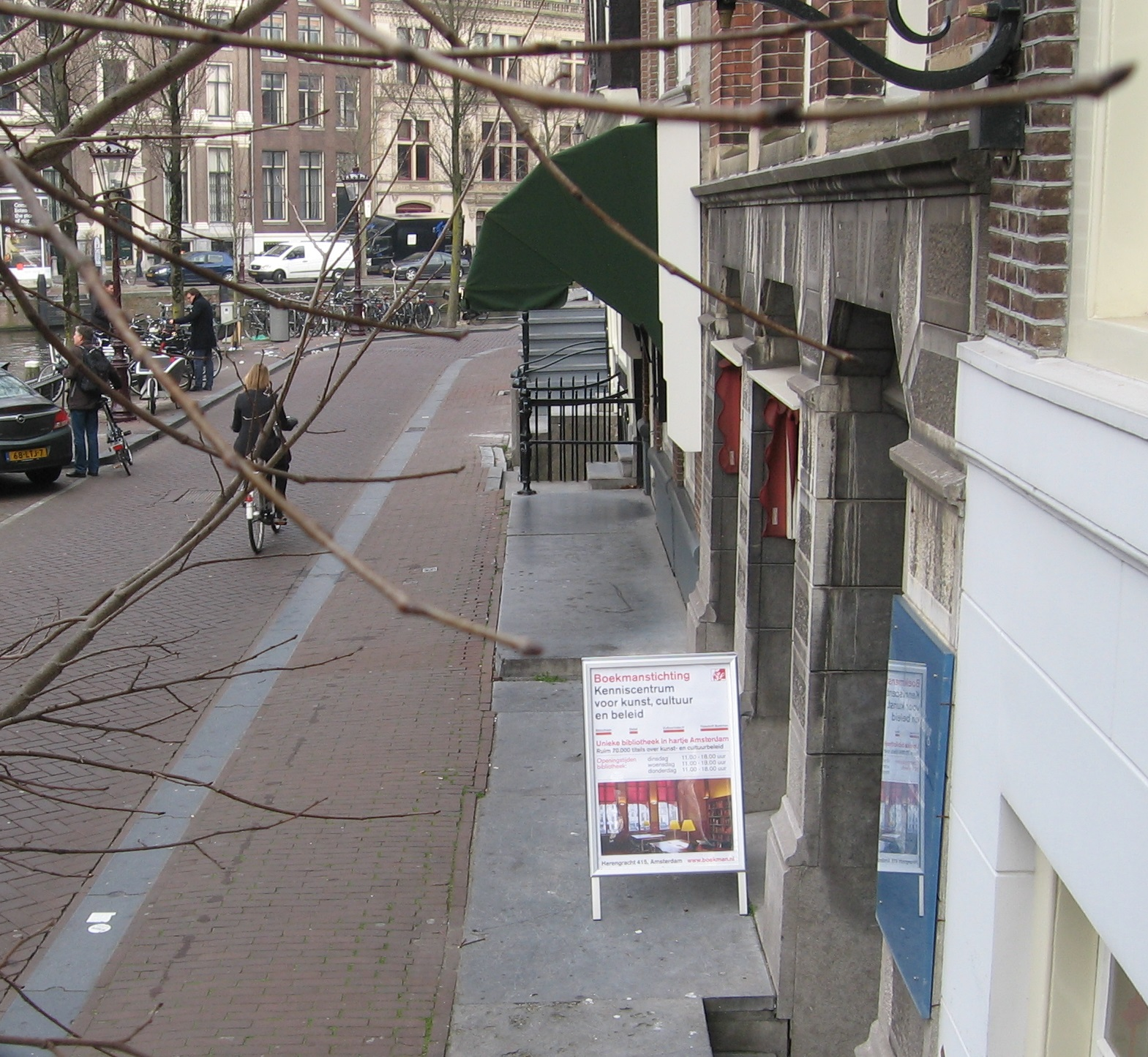
Front on the Herengracht canal, Amsterdam 2015.

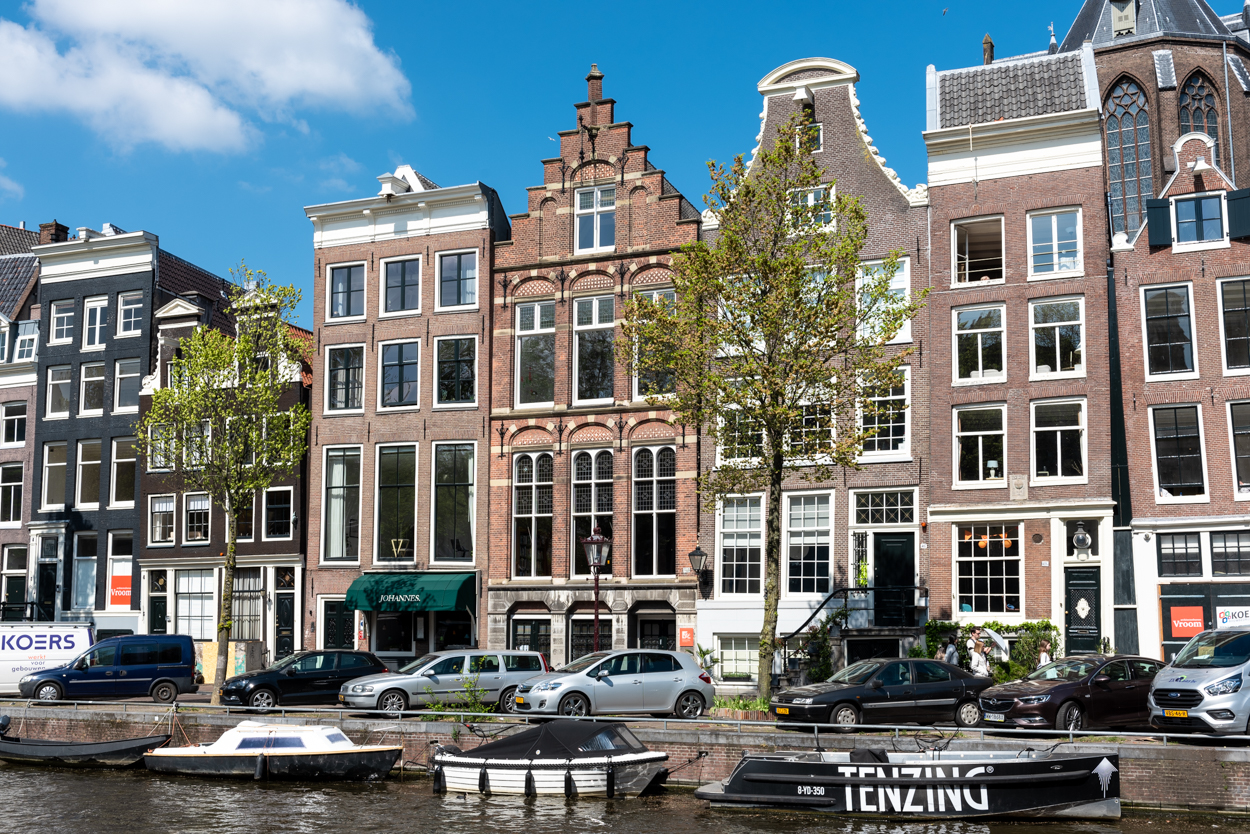
Headquarters along the Herengracht canal, Amsterdam 2022.
