= Ons' Lieve Heer op Solder =

House church and museum in Amsterdam

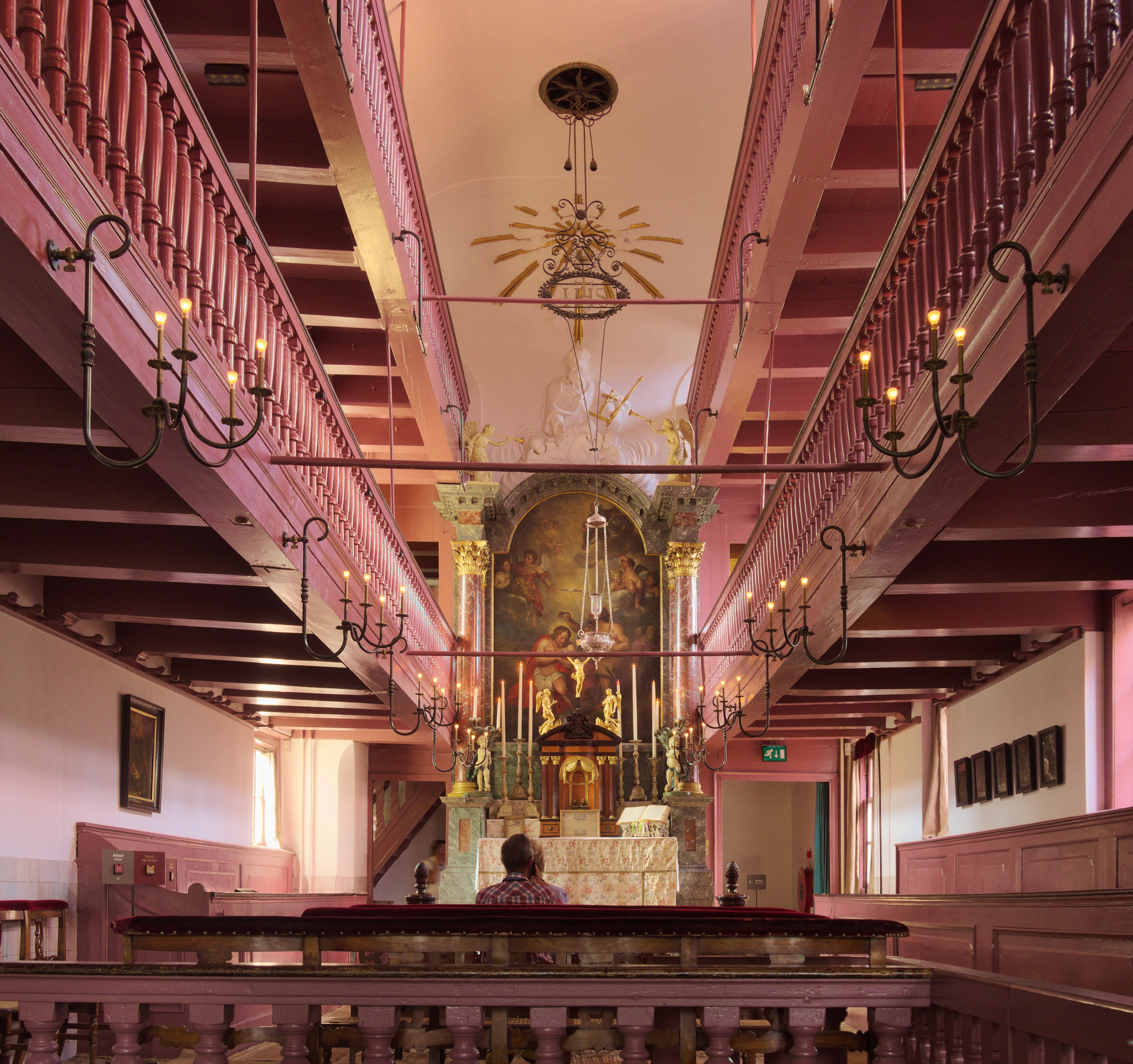
- Interior of the house church

- Location in Amsterdam
- Established: 28 April 1888
- Location: Oudezijds Voorburgwal 40; Amsterdam, The Netherlands
- Coordinates: 52.375°N 4.899°E
- Type: Historic house
- Visitors: 85,000
- Director: Judikje Kiers
- Public transit access: Amsterdam Centraal
- Website: www.opsolder.nl

Ons' Lieve Heer op Solder (OLHOS; English: Our Lord in the Attic) is a 17th-century canal house, house church, and museum in the city center of Amsterdam, The Netherlands. The Catholic church was built on the top three floors of the canal house during the 1660s. It is an important example of a "schuilkerk", or "clandestine church" in which Catholics and other religious dissenters from the seventeenth-century Dutch Reformed Church, unable to worship in public, held services. The church has been open as a museum since 28 April 1888, and has 85,000 visitors annually.

== Canal house ==
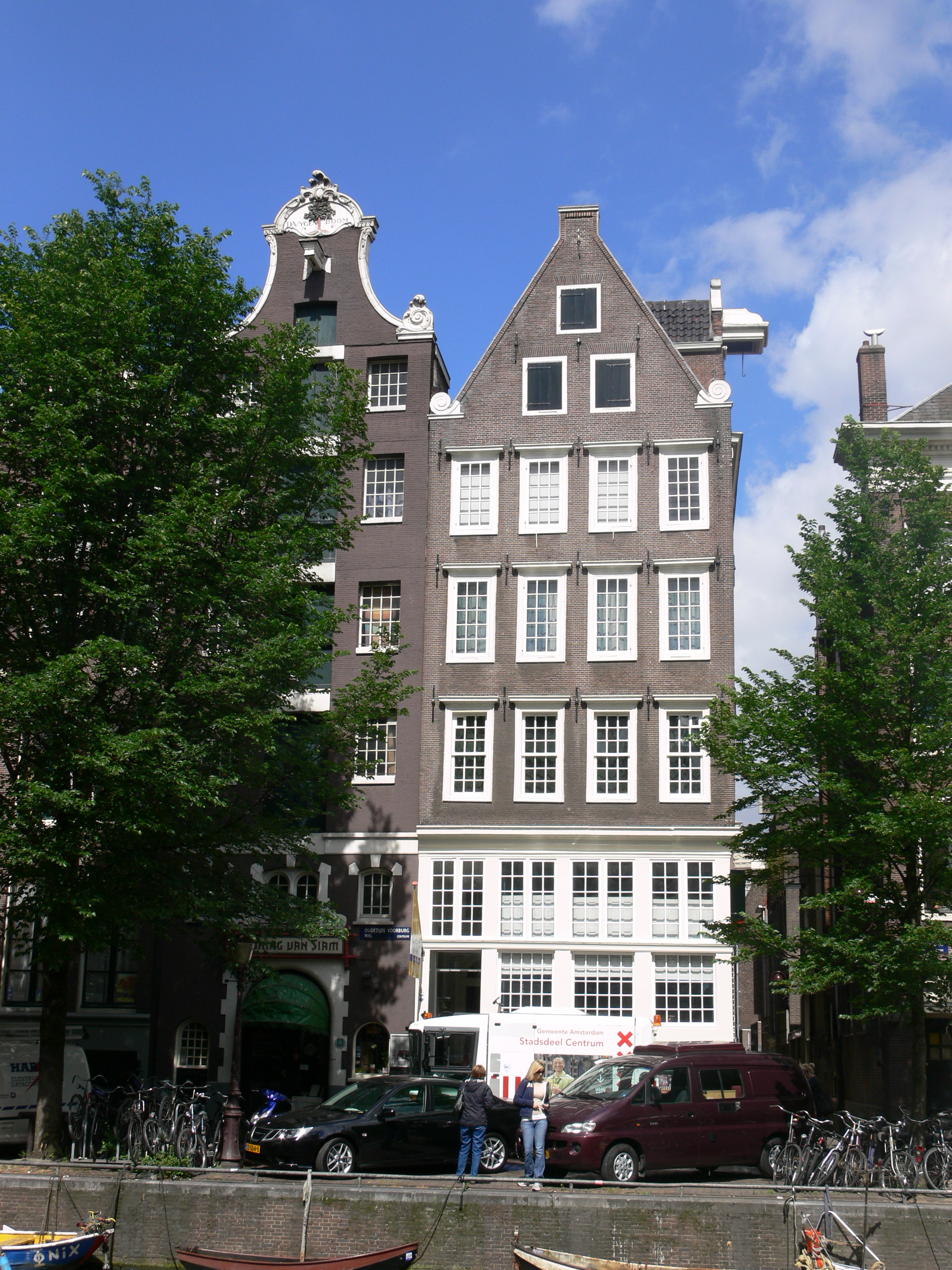
The canal house on the Oudezijds Voorburgwal 40

The canal house on the 14th century canal Oudezijds Voorburgwal, currently on number 40, was built in 1630. Between 1661 and 1663 the top three floors of the house were changed into a house church. The building was renovated in the 18th and 19th centuries.

== Museum ==
After the Church of St Nicholas was opened, the house church was no longer in use as a church. On 28 April 1888 it opened its doors for the public as a museum, making it the second-oldest museum in Amsterdam, after Rijksmuseum Amsterdam. The museum was previously named Museum Amstelkring and is now called Museum Ons' Lieve Heer op Solder (English: Museum Our Lord in the Attic). Annually, about 85,000 people visit the museum.

The museum contains the front room, the between room, the hall, the church, the Lady chapel, the confessional, the Jaap Leeuwenberg Hall, and the 17th-century kitchen.

The property has been listed as rijksmonument 6107. Between 2010 and 2018 the museum participated in Amsterdam Heritage Museums, a collective promotion effort. In 2024, the museum was awarded the European Heritage Label.

== Collection ==
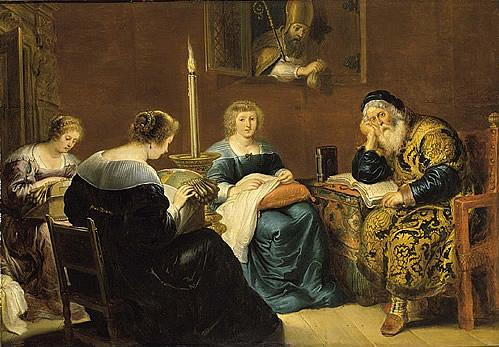
The charity of Saint Nicholas (1640) by Cornelis de Vos

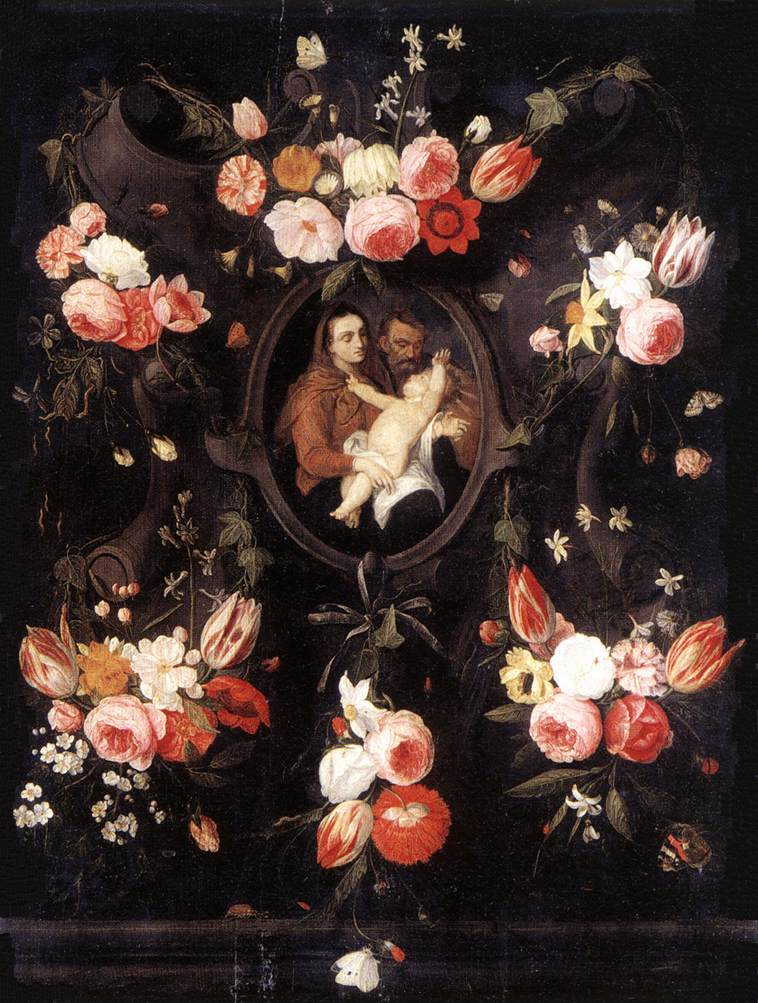
Holy Family (c. 1665) by Jan van Kessel the Elder

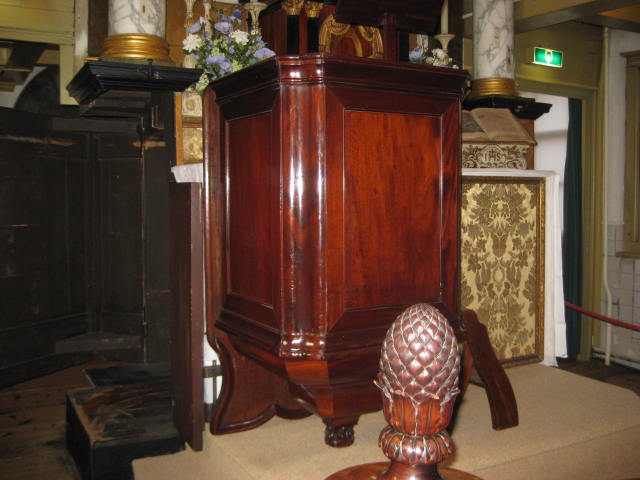
The pulpit
