= Emanuel Boekman =

Dutch politician

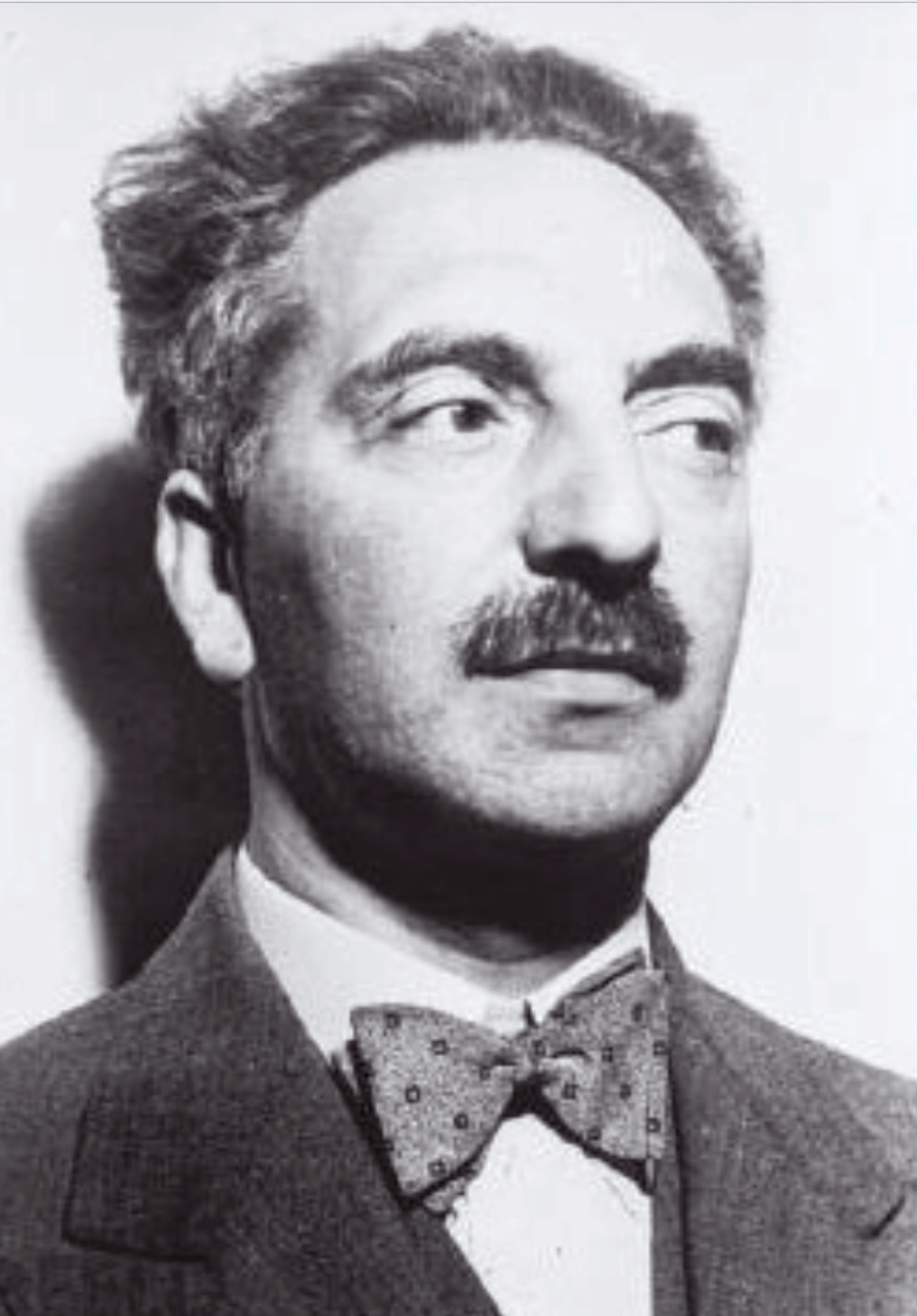
- Boekman (1930s)

Personal details
- Born: Emanuel Boekman; 15 August 1889 Amsterdam, Netherlands
- Died: 15 May 1940 (aged 50) Amsterdam, Netherlands
- Party: Social Democratic Workers' Party (1921-1940)
- Spouse: Jansje Nerde (?-1940)
- Occupation: Politician; Civil servant Typographer; Demographer; Statistician

Emanuel ("Manus") Boekman (15 August 1889 – 15 May 1940) was a Dutch social democratic politician, statistician, demographer and typographer. He is remembered for his activities as a municipal executive board member for education and culture (wethouder) in Amsterdam (1931-1933, 1935-1940) and his advocacy for an active state cultural policy.

== Life ==
Alderman Boekman delivers the opening speech for a checkers worldchampion duel between Raichenbach and Vos. Polygoon cinema newsreel of 1m 35s, Amterdam, 30 December 1935.

Boekman was born into a dynasty of Jewish booksellers as the eldest son of Maurits Boekman (1869-1942), initially a diamond cutter, and Heintje Peereboom. At the age of twelve, he started working as a typographer. He was interested in politics and became a chairman of his trade union, the Typografen Jongelingen Vereeniging (Young Typographer's Society). Originally he was a follower of the early Dutch socialist Ferdinand Domela Nieuwenhuis. Boekman's spare time was devoted to studying, and he qualified for various teacher's degrees, including of economics.

In 1911 Boekman obtained a position as head of the administration of the Amsterdam Harbour Authority and, in 1916, became head of the department for statistics of the Rijksverzekeringsbank (nl), a state insurance bank. In this period, he became a prolific author on various subjects, ranging from statistics and economy to unemployment and alcoholism. From 1921 up to his death in 1940, Boekman was a member of the Amsterdam city council for the Dutch Social Democratic Workers' Party (SDAP). In 1931 he became a municipal executive board member (wethouder, alderman) for Amsterdam's education and culture.

On 6 June 1939, Boekman obtained his Ph.D. degree from the University of Amsterdam supervised by professor H.N. ter Veen. His thesis "Overheid en kunst in Nederland" (Government and art in the Netherlands) investigated the 19th and 20th-century history of Dutch cultural policy and projected seminal plans for cultural dissemination by the state and municipalities, e.g., by incorporating art in new building projects and giving the working class access to art. This thesis was influential and reprinted into the 1970s.

When the German army invaded the Netherlands in May 1940, Boekman initially stood by his principle that executives should not flee. Later on, when he had changed his mind, the escape route via IJmuiden to the United Kingdom became intractable. On capitulation day 15 May 1940, Boekman and his wife committed suicide together with their friends, the family of the social democrat professor Bob van Gelderen.

== Boekman Foundation ==
In 1963 the Boekman Foundation (Dutch: Boekmanstichting) was established, named after him by the Federatie van Kunstenaarsverenigingen (Federation of artist's societies). The Boekmanstichting is an independent center for the study of art, culture and policy.

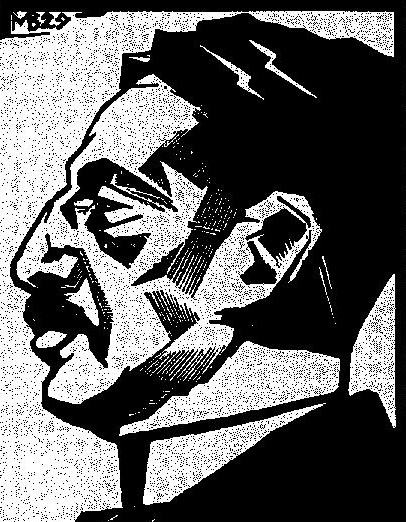
Boekman by Meyer Bleekrode

== Sources ==
- (in Dutch) Boekman, Emanuel: Overheid en kunst in Nederland, Thesis University of Amsterdam, 1939
- (in Dutch) G.W.B. Borrie, 'Boekman, Emanuel (1889-1940)', in Biografisch Woordenboek van Nederland.
- (in Dutch) Van Dulken, Hans en Jansen, Tony (red.): Het leven als leerschool. Portret van Emanuel Boekman, Amsterdam, 1989
- (in Dutch) Jansen, Tony, Boekman, Emanuel, Biografisch woordenboek van het socialisme en de arbeidersbeweging in Nederland, op socialhistory.org maintained by the International Institute of Social History
- (in Dutch) Jansen, Tony en Rogier, Jan: Kunstbeleid in Amsterdam, 1920-1940: Dr. E. Boekman en de socialistische gemeentepolitiek, Nijmegen, SUN, 1983.
- (in English) Maas, Harro: A pragmatic intellectual. Dutch Fabians, Boekman and cultural policy in the Netherlands, 1890-1940, International Journal of Cultural Policy 12(2006)2, 151-170
- (in Dutch), C. e.a.: Van Boekman tot Schimmelpennink. De kleine geschiedenis van een boekhandel op de Weteringschans, 2003
