= Keizersgracht 453 =

Coordinates: 52.3664°N 4.8865°E

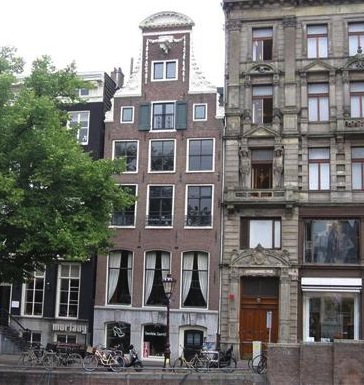
Keizersgracht 453

Keizersgracht 453 is a canal house with a neck gable on the northeastern side of the Keizersgracht between Leidsegracht and Leidsestraat. It is a national monument of "very high value" (zeer hoge waarde) and "national distinction" (nationale kenmerkendheid) according to the Dutch Cultural Heritage agency.

== Construction ==
It was built in 1669.

== Residents and Functions ==
- In 1855, Michael Wilhelm Lieber (b. 1788-05?-13), a doctor, lived here.
- In July 1867 Fredericus Hendricus Schuver (b. 1825-08-17), a trader, moved here

=== Cornelis van Gogh ===
- Cornelis Marinus van Gogh (1826–1908), uncle of the famous artist Vincent van Gogh, moved his bookshop here in 1871. "Uncle Cor" originally worked at his brother Hein's bookshop and his brother (another Vincent)'s art gallery. He set up his own bookshop and art dealership (1849), moving to the Leidsestraat in 1853 before moving to the Keizersgracht. The more famous, younger Vincent, paid a visit to the shop in 1877-1878. In 1882 Uncle Cor commissioned two series of cityscapes of The Hague from Vincent. The bookshop here remained until around Cornelis' death.
- The house was put up for auction on 27 November 1911 and acquired by Mr. F.W. Heythekker who ran an office furniture and office supply store there
- The house was auctioned again on 29 March 1920
- At some time during the 1910s the house was split up into multiple spaces for a shop, offices, and residences:
  - There are newspaper advertisements for a Prakta typewriter store in the house (19 June 1919).
  - Mr. J.M. Baay lived here (from 1931). Mr. Baay renovated Prinsengracht 971.
  - Mr. Antonius Reinoud Wilhelmus Maria Dunselman had his office or possibly residence here (1932). Mr. Dunselman (b. 1901) was the loyal lawyer of Otto Frank, Anne Frank's father, and in early 1935 was appointed supervisory director (commissaris)of Mr. Frank's company Opekta when the laws came into effect prohibiting Jewish ownership of companies.
  - Offices of Lumina, a Dutch film studio (1934)
  - The Delcama cigar factory (1937-?)
- The building remains divided into apartments and offices

== Former house number ==
In the house numbering system prior to 1875, the house had the number 364 in district JJ ("JJ 364").

In the house numbering system previous to that (before 1853) the house had number (kleine nummer) 162 in district 55.
