= Museum Willet-Holthuysen =

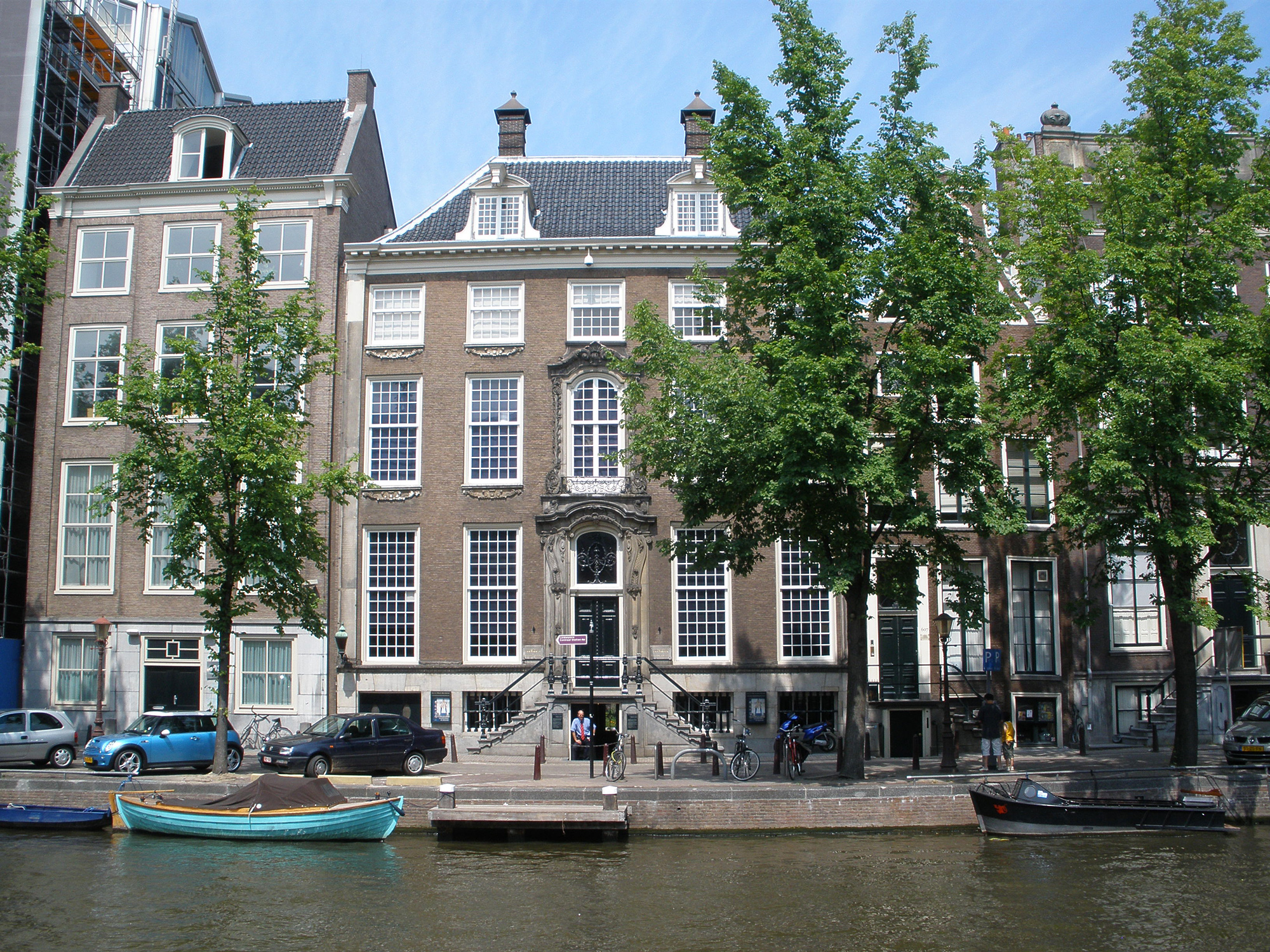
- Front of the museum in 2008

- Location in Amsterdam
- Established: ca. 1685 (building); 1896 (museum)
- Location: Herengracht 605; Amsterdam, Netherlands
- Coordinates: 52.365556°N 4.899167°E
- Type: Art museum
- Public transit access: Tram stop Rembrandtplein; Metro stop Waterlooplein
- Website: www.willetholthuysen.nl

Museum Willet-Holthuysen is a located on the Herengracht in Amsterdam. The Amsterdam famous ring of canals is on the UNESCO World Heritage List.

== History ==
The house was built for Jacob Hop, mayor of Amsterdam, around 1685. He was not the last mayor to own the house. In 1739 the outside was redesigned to look as it does today, in the then fashionable Louis XIV style. In 1895, its owner, Louisa Holthuysen, bequeathed the building and its contents, including the art collected by her and her husband, Abraham Willet, to the city of Amsterdam on condition that it became a museum bearing their names.

== The house ==
Three floors are open to the public, the souterrain, with the kitchen and garden (restored in 1972), the first floor (bel-etage with long hallway), and the top floor, with one bedroom on display and rooms for exhibitions. In the blue room, several paintings on the walls show previous owners (by unspecified artists). In this room there are also several decorative paintings by Jacob de Wit, though these have been sourced from other buildings in Amsterdam. Decorative pieces by Jacob de Wit were at some stage in the house, but previous owners took them with them. It is not clear if some of the current Jacob de Wit paintings are 'back home'.

Flower paintings are on display by various Amsterdam painters, such as Adriana Johanna Haanen.

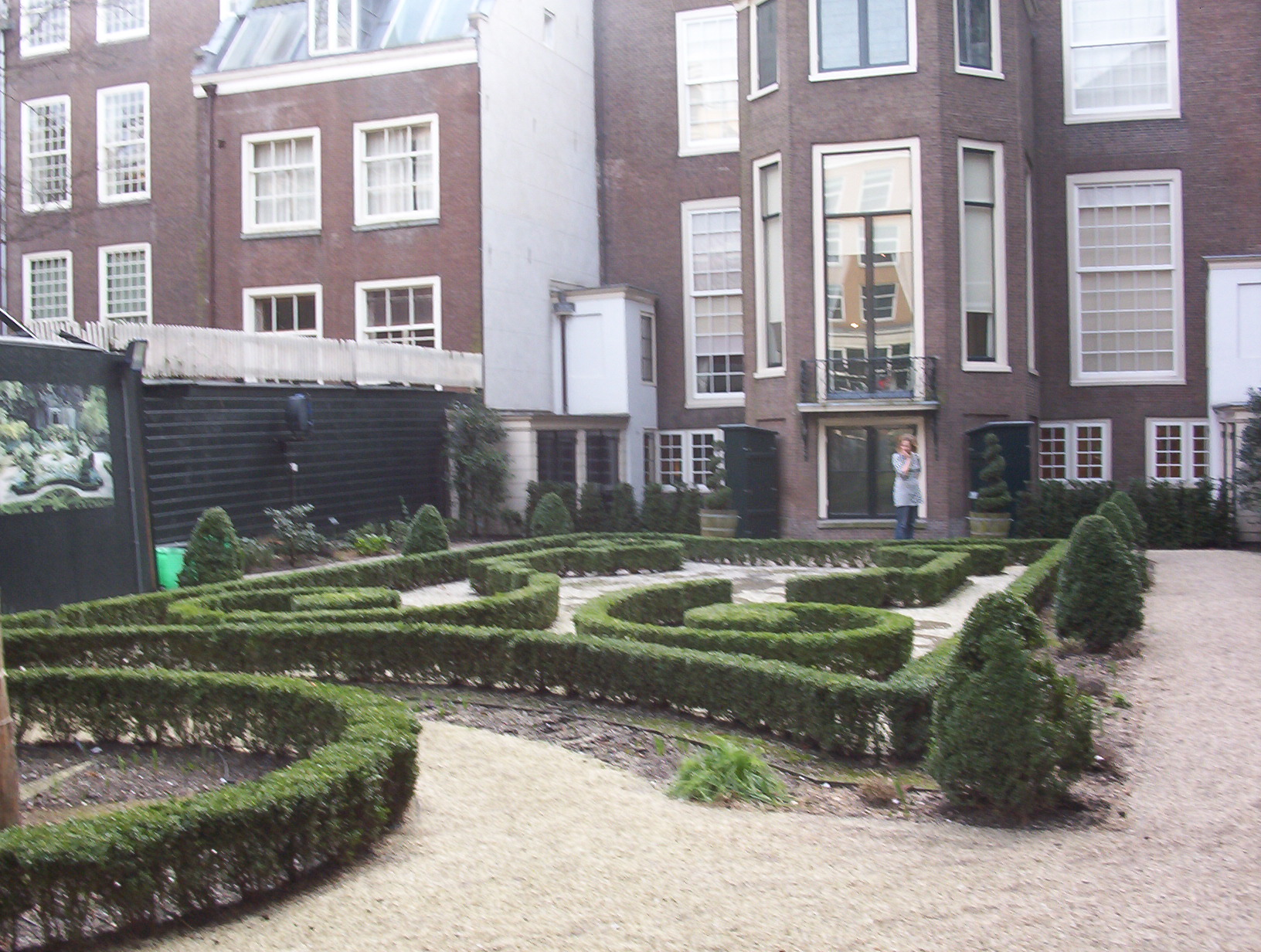
French-style garden or 'hortus'

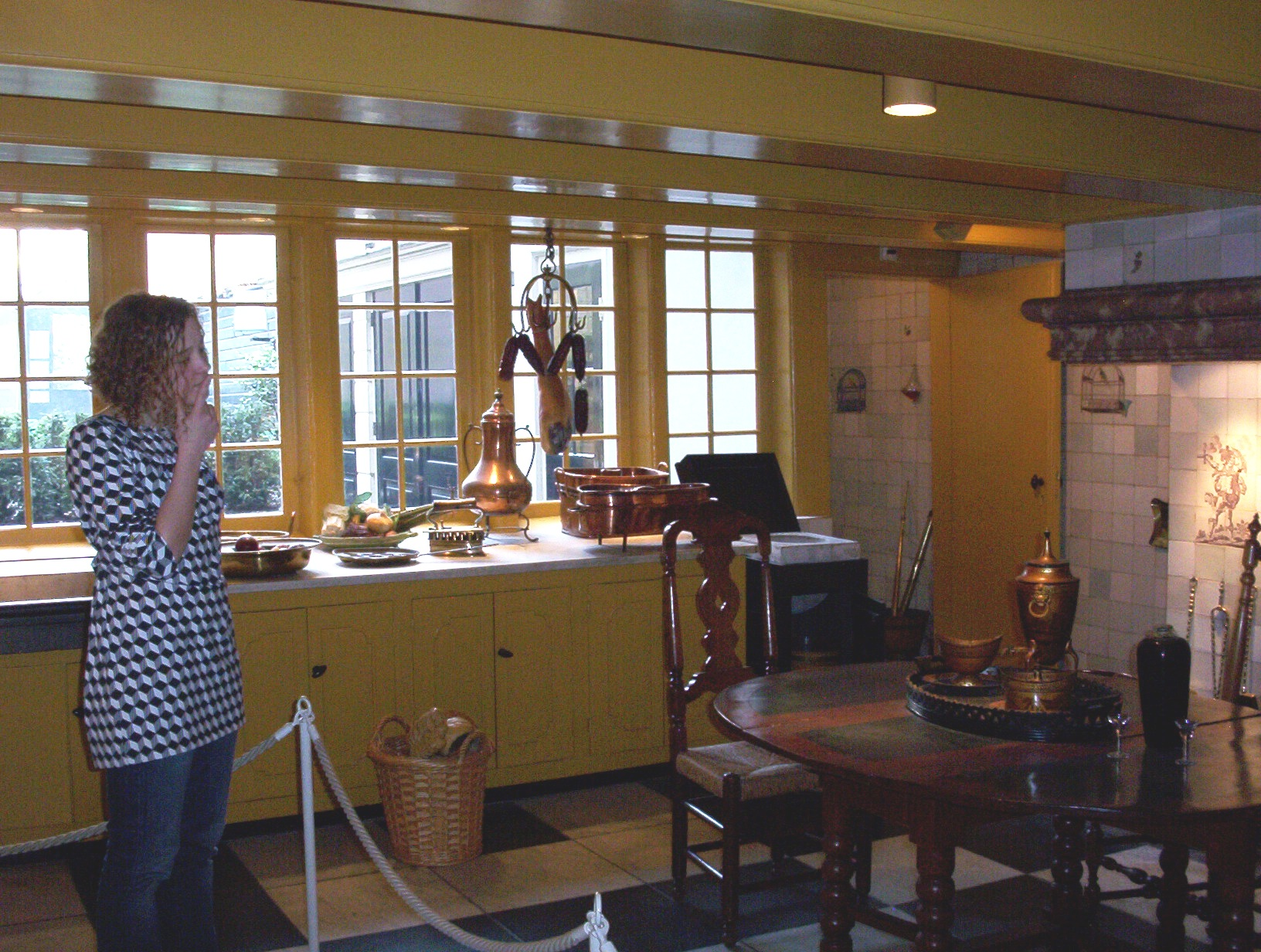
Kitchen with original tiled walls

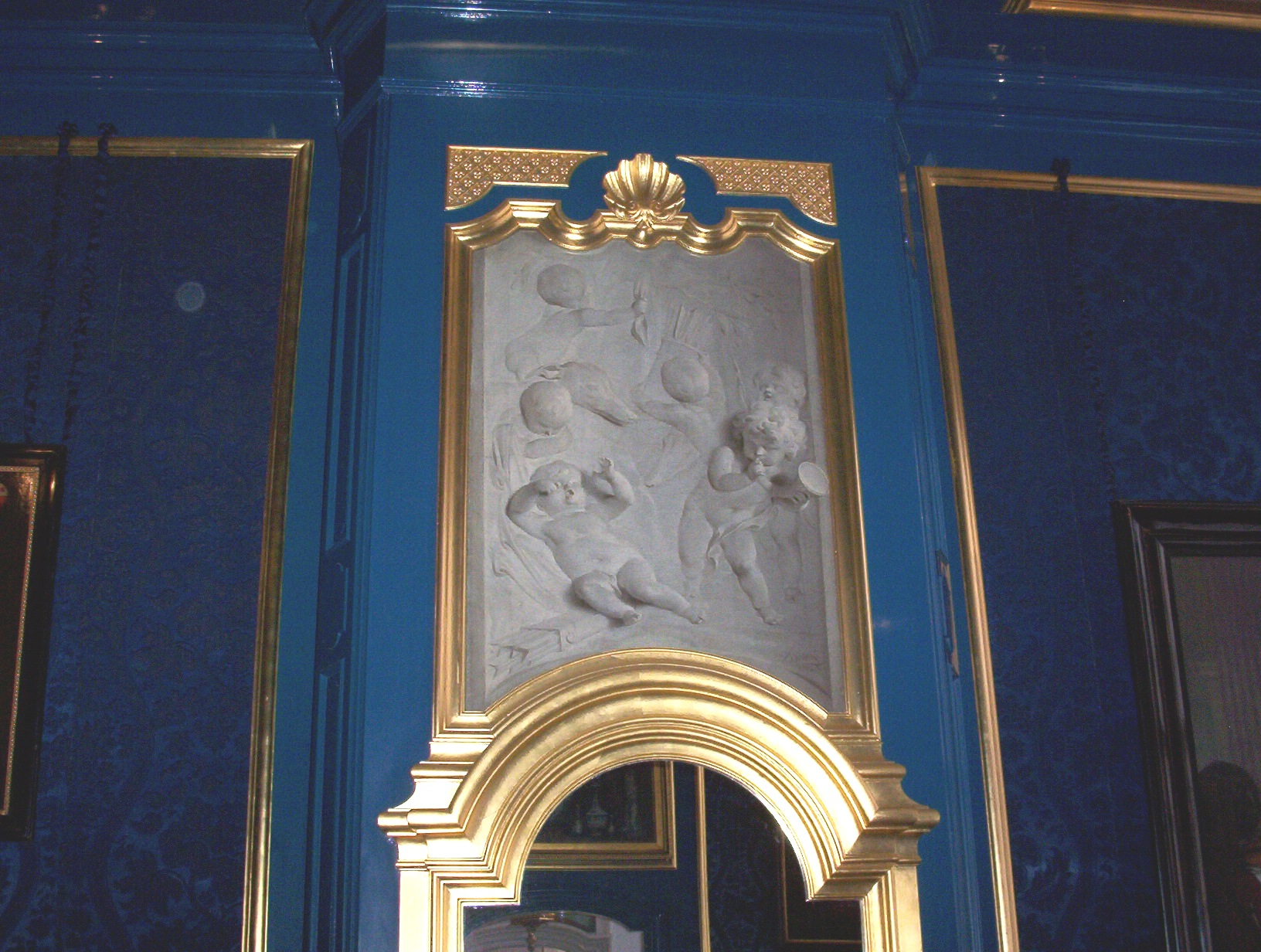
Wall grisaille by Jacob de Wit
