= Herengracht =

Canal in Amsterdam

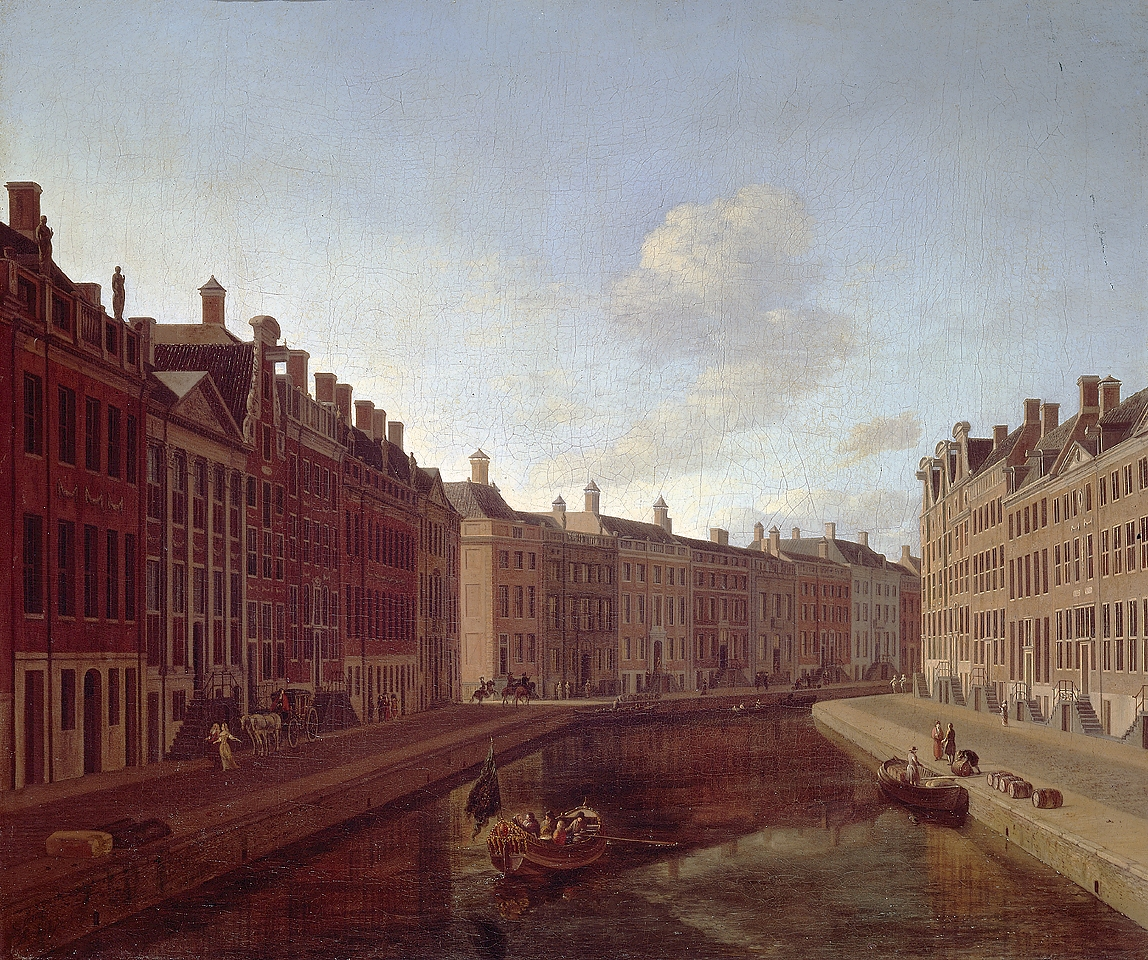
- The bend of the Herengracht in Amsterdam (1685) Gerrit Adriaensz. Berckheyde

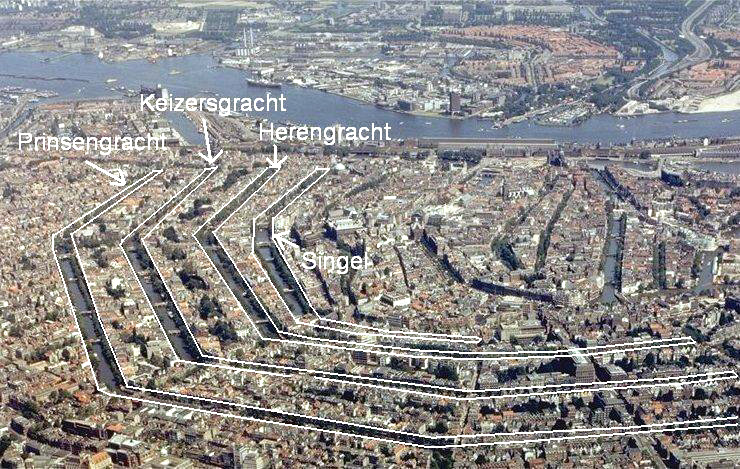
- Location of the canal in the canal belt
- Length: 2.4 kilometres (1.5 mi)
- Location: Amsterdam
- Postal code: 1015, 1016, 1017
- Coordinates: 52.371265°N 4.886956°E
- From: Brouwersgracht
- To: Amstel

Construction
- Construction start: 17th century

The Herengracht (Dutch pronunciation: [ˈɦeːrə(ŋ)ˌɣrɑxt]) is the second of four Amsterdam canals belonging to the canal belt and lies between the Singel and the Keizersgracht. The Gouden Bocht (Golden Bend) in particular is known for its large and beautiful canal houses.

== History ==
The Herengracht was built starting in 1612 on the initiative of mayor Frans Hendricksz. Oetgens, city carpenter Hendrick Jacobsz. Staets and city surveyor Lucas Jansz Sinck. Before that it was a moat (dug in 1585) for the companies located behind the Singel. The canal ran within the city wall parallel to the canal outside the city wall. The Herengracht therefore still has a kink at Driekoningenstraat, where the outer moat was routed around a stronghold at that height. When the ditch was widened into the present canal it was given the name Herengracht in 1612, after the Heren Regeerders van de stad Amsterdam (Gentlemen Governors of the city of Amsterdam).

The part between Leidsegracht and the Binnen Amstel is part of the expansion after 1658. This part contains the Gouden Bocht (Golden Bend), the most prestigious part of the Herengracht. Many of the houses were inhabited here by regents, mayors and traders who earned their fortunes in trade with South America or the Dutch East Indies.

Many buildings were built by the Amsterdam architects Philips Vingboons (1607–78) or Adriaan Dortsman (1635–82).

In the last expansion, the section east of the Amstel was laid to the water of the IJ. This last part, located in the prosperous part of Amsterdam's Jewish quarter, was named Nieuwe Herengracht.

== Monuments ==
There are many monumental canal houses on Herengracht, such as:

- 59: De Hond, (The Dog), from 1659.
- 120: De Coningh van Denemarken (The King of Denmark), from 1615.
- 170–172: Bartolotti House, or "Het Bonte Huis", from around 1617.
- 203: Koopmanshuis, from ± 1618.
- 274: D 'Witte Leli, from 1739.
- 284: Van Brienen House, from 1728.
- 361: Sonnenberg, from ± 1655.
- 364–370: Cromhouthuizen, from 1660 to 1662
- 394: Vier Heemskinderen, from ± 1671. Named for the legend of The Four Sons of Aymon.
- 432: The former home of pastor Ferdinand Domela Nieuwenhuis.
- 446: Huis van de Graeff, former city palace of Andries de Graeff
- 450: Huis van Deutz, from 1663, house of Andries Adolf Deutz van Assendelft after 1722.
- 462: Sweedenrijk (Sweden), from 1672.
- 476: Huis De Vicq, from 1670.
- 475: Huis De Neufville (Huis aan de Bocht), from 1731 and 1733.
- 478: House of John Sillem (1837-1896), Dutch banker
- 502: Huis met de Kolommen (House with the Columns), from 1672; official residence of the mayor of Amsterdam.
- 510: the House with Two Gods of the Sea on the Gable, built in 1688. The gods are Neptune and Triton.
- 528–530: Two houses under one roof from 1686, commissioned by the brothers Louis of Lodewijk Trip (1605-1684) and Hendrick Trip (1607-1666), the same clients of the Trippenhuis on Kloveniersburgwal 29 in Amsterdam. Vestibule 528 rebuilt by architect Eduard Cuypers in 1895.
- 572: Heren aan de Gracht, with 18th-century period rooms.
- 573: The former residence of Cornelis de Graeff and formerly the Museum of Bags and Purses.

There are also historic gardens, including the garden and garden house of G. Belin la Garde at number 412 and a historical garden at number 168.

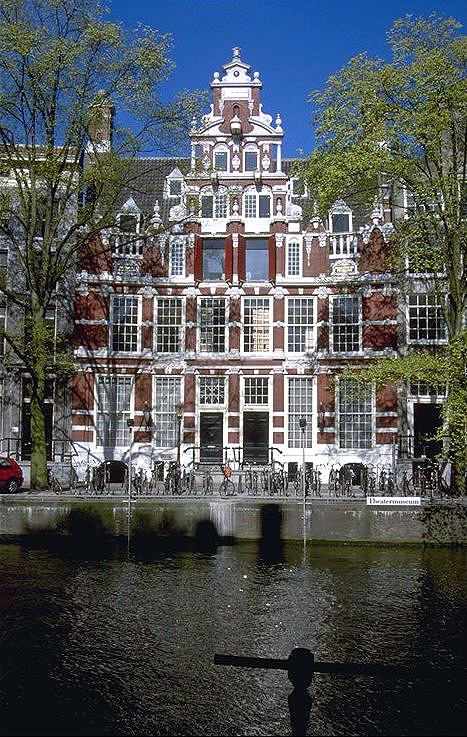
Bartolotti House, Herengracht 170

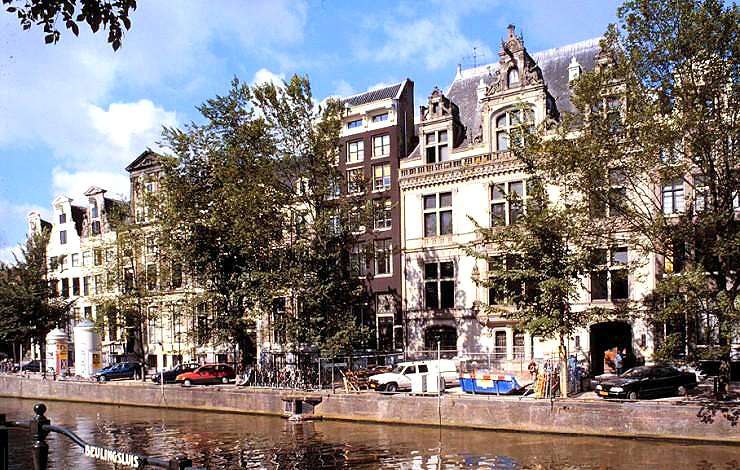
Herengracht 380

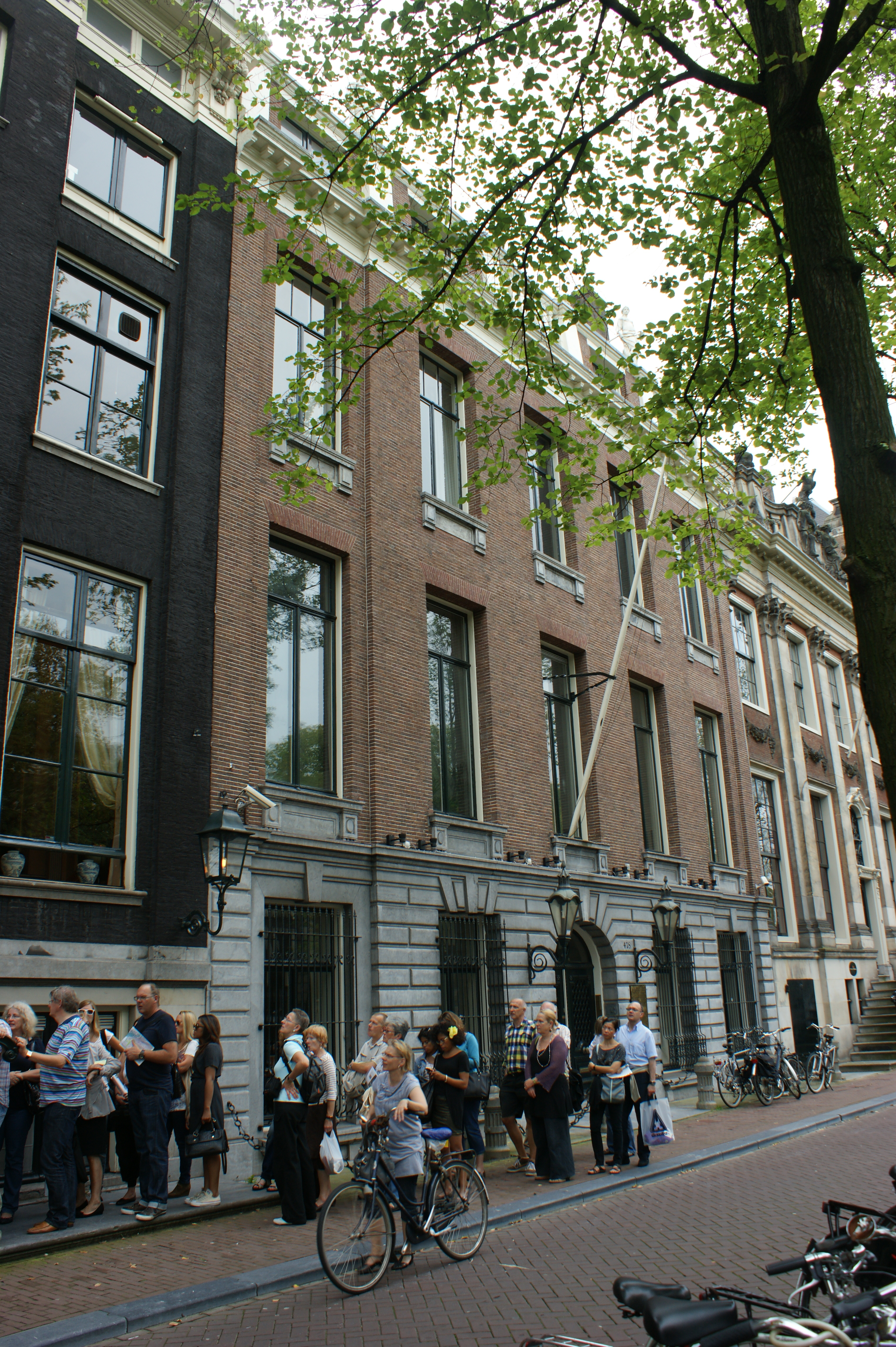
Herengracht 478

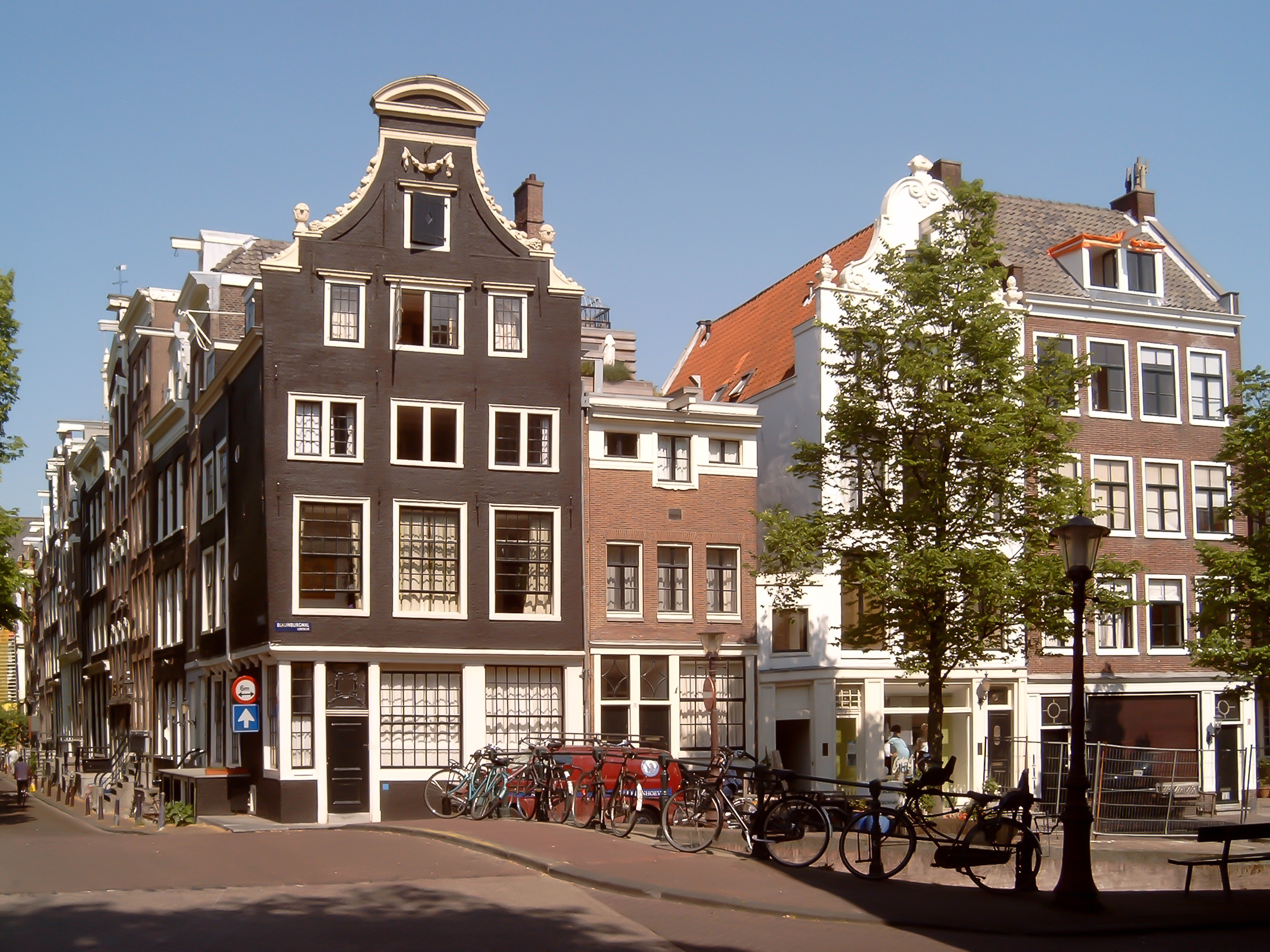
Herengracht, corner of Blauwburgwal

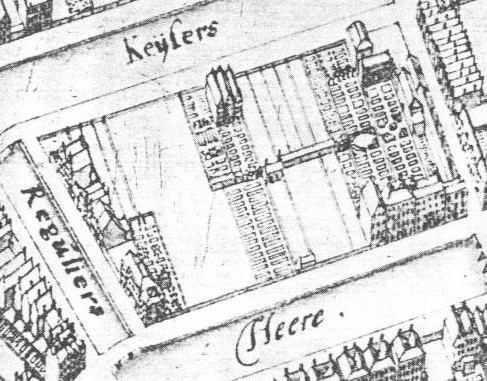
Detail map by Jacobus Bosch, showing that in 1680 many plots had not yet been built

== Museums ==
- Bartolotti Museum House, Herengracht 170
- The Canal House at Herengracht 386.
- The KattenKabinet at Herengracht 497.
- The Museum Geelvinck-Hinlopen at Herengracht 518 (entrance: Keizersgracht 633).
- The Museum Willet-Holthuysen at Herengracht 605 with a formal garden adjacent to the Amstelstraat.
- The activities of the Toneelmuseum (formerly in 'Huis Bartolotti') have been taken over by the Theater Instituut Nederland (nl) at Sarphatistraat 53, Amsterdam.

== Orientation ==
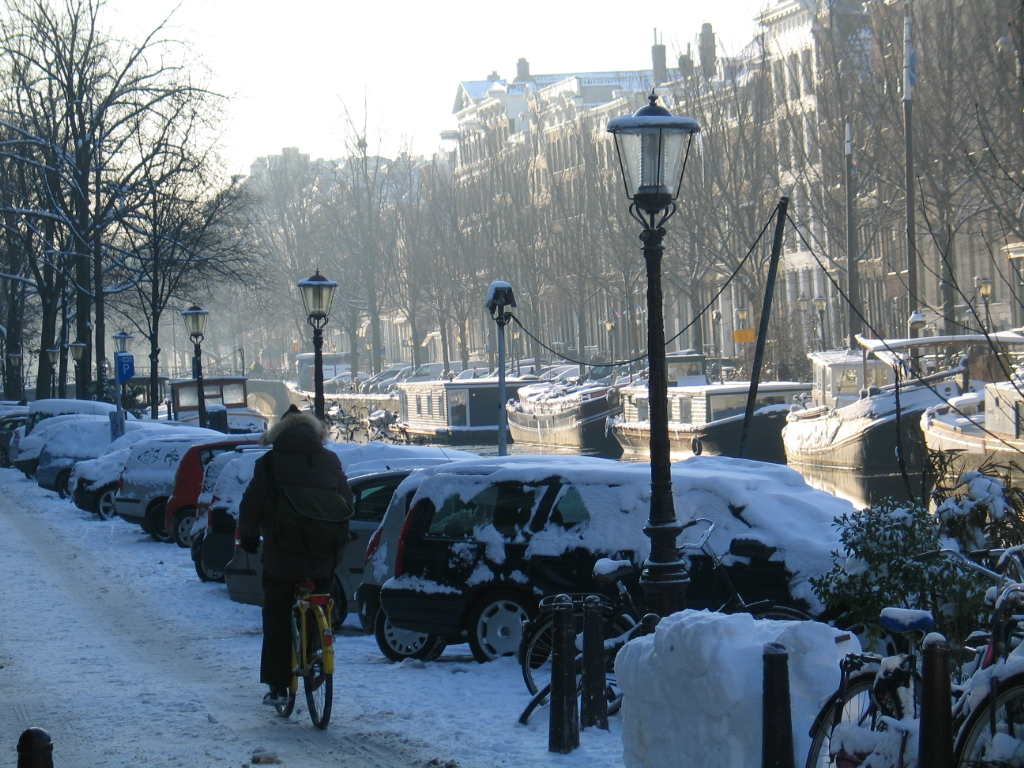
Start of Herengracht from Brouwersgracht

Herengracht begins in the north at the Brouwersgracht in the West-Indisch Huis bridge and Milkmaid Bridge, parallels bends on the Singel and the Keizersgracht gradually towards the southeast, and flows into the Amstel. The odd-numbered side of the canal is on the side of the heart of the city, closer to Dam Square.

- The intersection with Raadhuisstraat is at Herengracht 184 and 211
- The junction with Leidsestraat / Koningsplein is located at Herengracht 424 and 433.
- The junction with Vijzelstraat is located at Herengracht 482 and 513.
- The Thorbeckeplein is located at Herengracht 561 and 563 at the Reguliersgracht.
- The intersection with Utrechtsestraat is at Herengracht 556 and 587.
- The canal flows into the Amstel at Herengracht 598 and 627.

== Bridges ==
The Herengracht is spanned by eleven bridges:

Number	Name	Crossing	Type	Passage width	Passage height	Height at 4m width	Managed by
18		Herenstraat	Arch	5,70	2,34	1,82	Centrum
20	Anton Jolingbrug	Leliegracht	Fixed	5,70	1,80		Centrum
22	Warmoesbrug	Raadhuisstraat	Fixed	5,75	1,80		DiVV
24		Hartenstraat	Fixed	5,61	1,79		Centrum
25		Wolvenstraat	Fixed	5,65	1,79		Centrum
26	Vingboonsbrug (officieus)	Wijde Heisteeg	Fixed	6,84	1,80		Centrum
29	Koningssluis	Koningsplein	Fixed	6,92	1,80		DiVV
30	Isa van Eeghenbrug	Vijzelstraat	Fixed	6,98	1,80		DiVV
32	Kaasmarktsluis	Reguliersgracht	Fixed	6,71	3,01	2,20	Centrum
34		Utrechtsestraat	Fixed	6,80	1,80		DiVV
35	Hendrick Jacobsz. Staetsbrug	Amstel	Fixed	6,00	2,71	2,22	Centrum

With the passage heights in the table, one should take into account the fact that the Herengracht, like all other canals in the city center, is -0.40 metres (1 ft 4 in) from the Amsterdam Ordnance Datum.

== Housing costs ==
The Herengracht index is an economic index which records the price of housing along the canal from 1628 to the present. The index was created by real estate finance professor Piet Eichholz of Maastricht University. The index goes back to the construction of the Herengracht in the 1620s. It was first published from 1628 up to 1973, and later extended to 2008.

== Herengracht canals elsewhere ==
The Herengracht in The Hague is filled in. The city's Madurodam miniature park exhibits a part of the Amsterdam Herengracht in miniature.

Maarssen also has a Herengracht, located on the right bank of the Vecht. There are also Herengrachts in Drimmelen, Leiden, Muiden, Middelburg, Purmerend, Terneuzen, Weesp, and also in Cape Town (now Adderley Street) and other places in South Africa.

== See also ==
- Canals of Amsterdam
