= Regent =

One who governs in place of a monarch

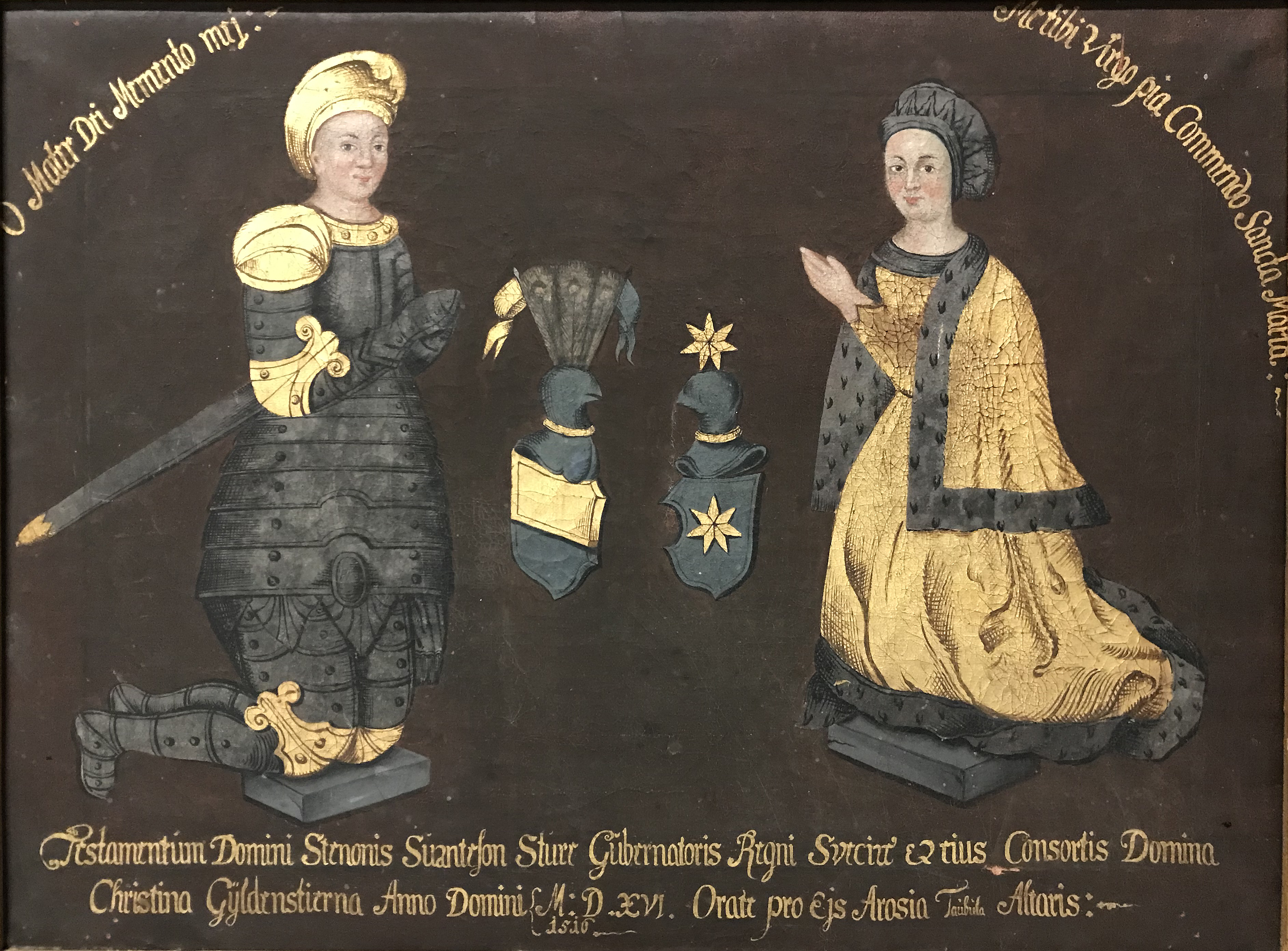
16th century Swedish regent Stenonis Sture and wife Christina Gyllenstierna who both operated in strong resistance to Danish rule during the Kalmar Union

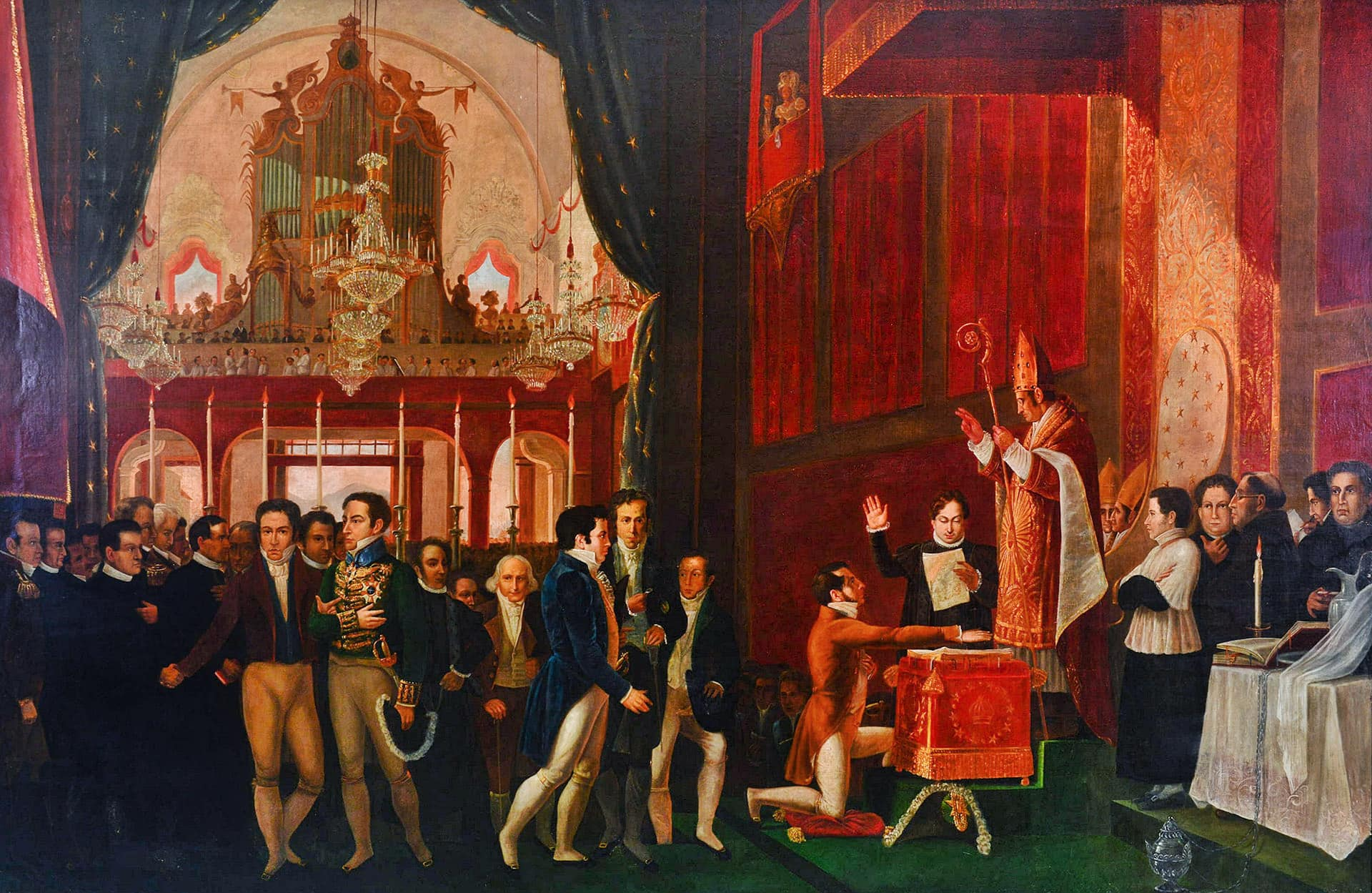
The oath of the provisional triumviral regents of the Empire of Brazil on behalf of the 5-year-old Emperor Pedro II in 1831, at the beginning of the Regency period.

In a monarchy, a regent (from Latin regens 'ruling, governing') is a person appointed to execute the office of a monarch temporarily, essentially as a substitute ruler. Regencies may arise for a number of reasons, including the monarch being a minor, ill, absent from the country, or otherwise unavailable. A regent may also be appointed in cases where the throne is vacant, or the identity of the legitimate monarch is disputed. The rule of a regent or regents is called a regency.

== Examples ==
A regent may also be appointed to govern, sometimes for an extended period of time, when there is no established ruling house. This was the case in the Kingdom of Hungary in the aftermath of World War I, where the royal line was considered extinct.

Another notable regency period includes that of the Prince Regent, later George IV of the United Kingdom, giving rise to many terms such as Regency era and Regency architecture. Strictly, this period lasted from 1811 to 1820, when his father George III was considered insane.

=== Europe ===
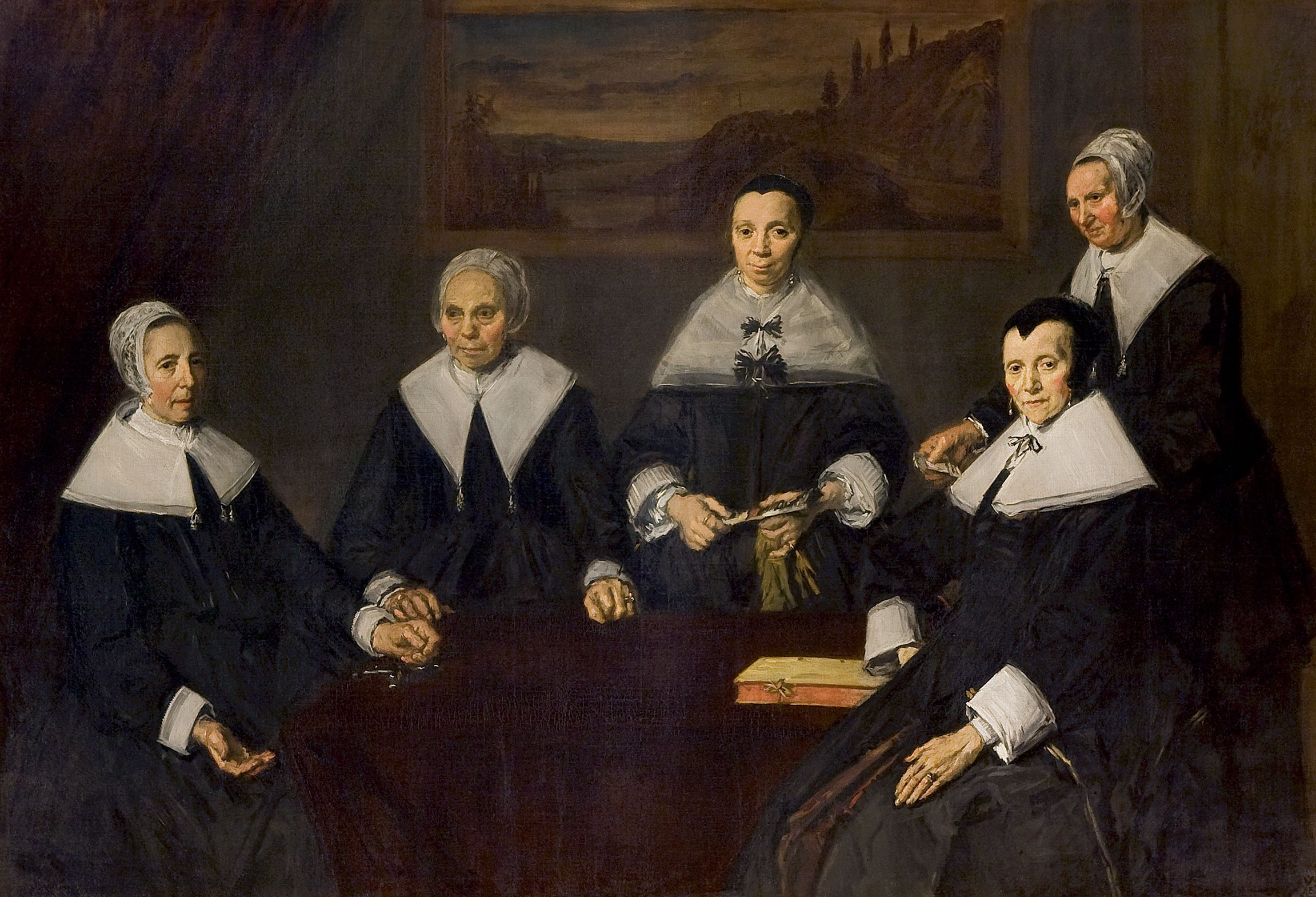
Regentesses of the Old Men's Almshouse in Haarlem, Frans Hals, 1664

In the Dutch Republic, the members of the ruling class, not formally hereditary but forming a de facto patrician class, were informally known collectively as regenten (the Dutch plural for regent) because they typically held positions as "regent" on the boards of town councils, as well as charitable and civic institutions. The regents group portrait, regentenstuk or regentessenstuk for female boards in Dutch, literally "regents' piece", is a group portrait of the board of trustees, called regents or regentesses, of a charitable organization or guild. This type of group portrait was popular in Dutch Golden Age painting during the 17th and 18th centuries.

Initially, King Henry II allowed his wife Catherine de' Medici almost no political influence as queen. Although she sometimes acted as regent during his absences from France, her formal powers were strictly nominal. Henry even gave the Château of Chenonceau, which Catherine had wanted for herself, to his mistress Diane de Poitiers instead, who took her place at the center of power, dispensing patronage and accepting favors. The imperial ambassador reported that in the presence of guests, Henry would sit on Diane's lap and play the guitar, chat about politics, or fondle her breasts. Diane never regarded Catherine as a threat. She even encouraged the king to spend more time with Catherine and sire more children. When Henry II died, Francis II, Catherine's 15 year old son, became king, but was beset with health issues. When Catherine realized Francis was eventually going to die, she made a pact with Antoine of Navarre by which he would renounce his right to the regency of the future king, Charles IX, in return for the release of his brother Condé. As a result, when Francis died on 5 December 1560, the Privy Council appointed Catherine as governor of France (gouvernante de France), with sweeping powers. She wrote to her daughter Elisabeth: "My principal aim is to have the honour of God before my eyes in all things and to preserve my authority, not for myself, but for the conservation of this kingdom and for the good of all your brothers".

=== Asia ===
==== East Asia ====
During the Western Zhou period, Duke Dan of Zhou served as regent for King Cheng of Zhou when his reign was just beginning due to his young age, and He, Earl of Gong did the same for King Xuan of Zhou after the exile of King Li of Zhou. The act of doing so was known as she (攝), though this could also refer to being in charge in general.

==== Southeast Asia ====
In the former Dutch East Indies, a regent was a native prince allowed to rule a de facto colonized state as a regentschap. Consequently, in the successor state of Indonesia, the term is used as the English translation of bupati, the head of a kabupaten (second level local government). In Malaysia, a pemangku raja (or pemangku sultan for Johor's case) is the interim ruler of a Malay state if its king is elected to be the Yang di-Pertuan Agong for the usual five-year term, or is unable to assume their role. For example, Tengku Hassanal Ibrahim Alam Shah, became Regent of Pahang after his father, Abdullah of Pahang was elected Yang di-Pertuan Agong XVI in 2019. Currently, Tunku Ismail is Regent of Johor when his father, Ibrahim Iskandar was elected as current Yang di-Pertuan Agong in 2024. In the Philippines – specifically, the University of Santo Tomas – the Father Regent, who must be a Dominican priest and is often also a teacher, serves as the institution's spiritual head. They also form the Council of Regents that serves as the highest administrative body of the university.

In 2016, Prem Tinsulanonda became regent at the age of 96. He became the regent for Rama X of Thailand, who chose not to formally accede to the throne until the end of the mourning period for his father. Similarly, Prince Regent Luitpold of Bavaria, was 91 at the end of his regency.

=== Africa ===
In Eswatini, where succession to the throne is not immediate, the Ndlovukati (similar to a queen mother) rules as regent until the new king is determined.

== Other uses ==
The term "regent" may also refer to positions lower than that of a state’s ruler. The term may be used in the governance of organisations, typically as an equivalent of "director", and held by all members of a governing board rather than just the equivalent of the chief executive. Some university managers in North America are called regents, and a management board for a college or university may be titled the "Board of Regents".

== See also ==
- Empress dowager
- Governor-general
- List of regents
- Queen dowager
- Queen mother
- Regency Acts
- Shikken
- Viceroy
