= Regents of the Old Men's Almshouse =

Painting by Frans Hals

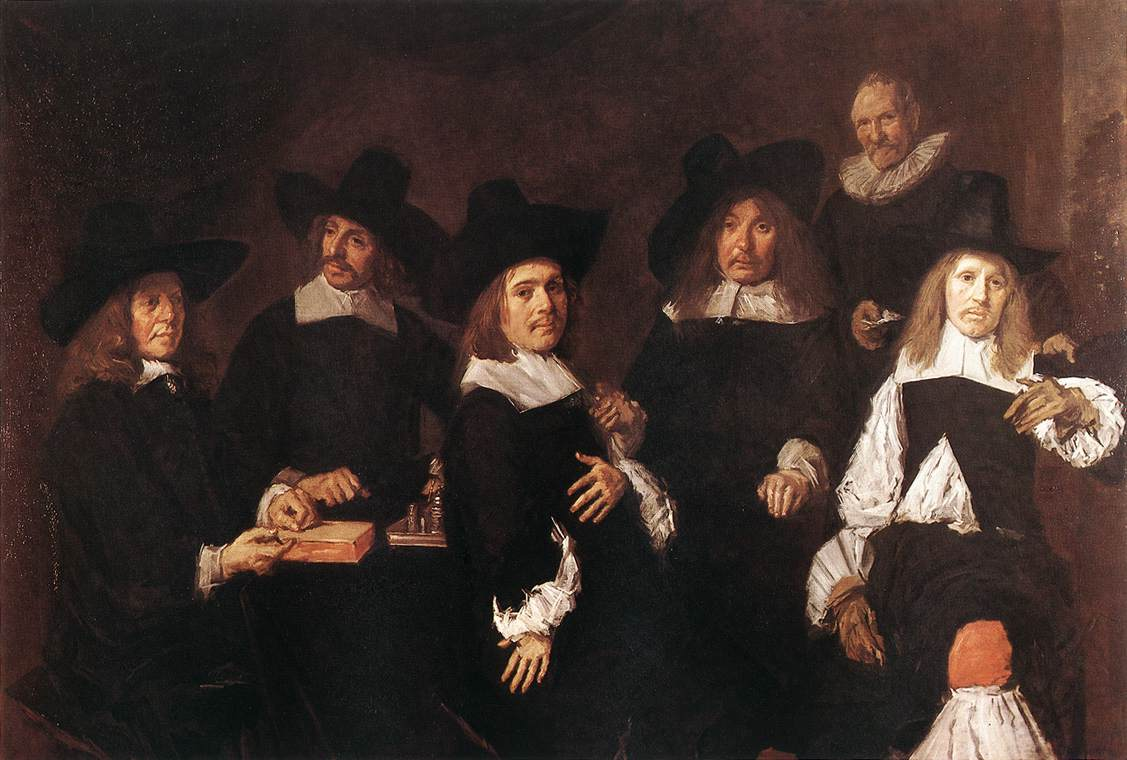
Portrait of The Regents of the Old Men's Almshouse Haarlem

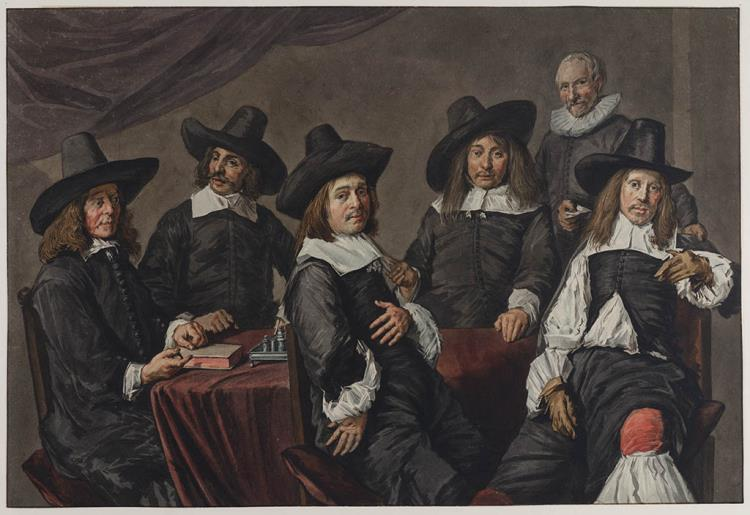
18th-century copy by Wybrand Hendriks shows how much darker the painting has become over the centuries

The Regents of the Old Men's Almshouse is a regents group portrait of five regents and their servant painted by Frans Hals in 1664 for the Oude Mannenhuis in Haarlem, the Netherlands. It forms a pendant with the Regentesses of the Old Men's Almshouse.

Though it is no longer known which name belongs with which face, the regents portrayed were Jonas de Jong, Mattheus Everzwijn, Dr. Cornelis Westerloo, Daniel Deinoot and Johannes Walles.

Frans Hals painted them in his "loose style", with rough brush strokes. The painting is traditionally dated 1664, though no archival evidence has yet been found to confirm this. The date is chosen as the middle of the term that the sitters served as regents. Though the paintings as pendants seem to belong together, they did not hang together, and as was the case in the St. Elisabeth hospital across the street, they probably each hung in a separate regents' meeting room; the one for the ladies in the ladies' meeting room and the one for the men in the men's meeting room.

The standing figure second from the right is holding out a piece of paper. He is older and wearing a collar that was long out of fashion by the 1660s. He is probably a valued servant or concierge, but his name has been lost. Seated next to him is a man wearing a floppy hat perched at an angle. His face appears distorted and some critics felt that Hals had lost his touch, while others believed the man had been drunk or suffered from nerve damage in the right half of his face, perhaps from a stroke. Whatever the case, the regents never complained about the painting and it is likely that they were satisfied with the commission they gave to the elderly Hals.

In the 19th century when Hals' loose brushwork became popular with impressionists, several copies were made of this painting. A much earlier copy that was made in the 18th century shows how layers of varnish almost made the table disappear altogether over time.

Today the painting is considered one of the highlights of the Frans Hals Museum, which is housed in the same building for which it was originally commissioned. The complex has been unrecognizably rebuilt, however, and the painting no longer hangs in a specific place, but moves around according to various exhibition needs.

== See also ==
- List of paintings by Frans Hals
