= Amsterdam Museum =

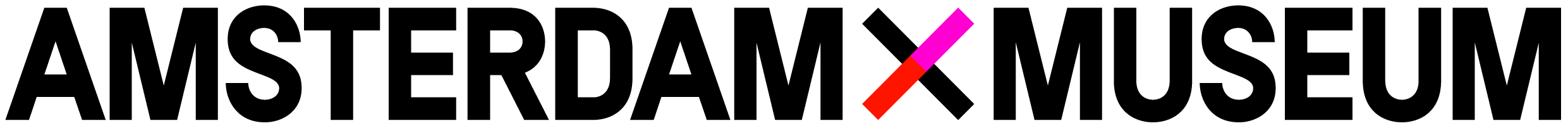

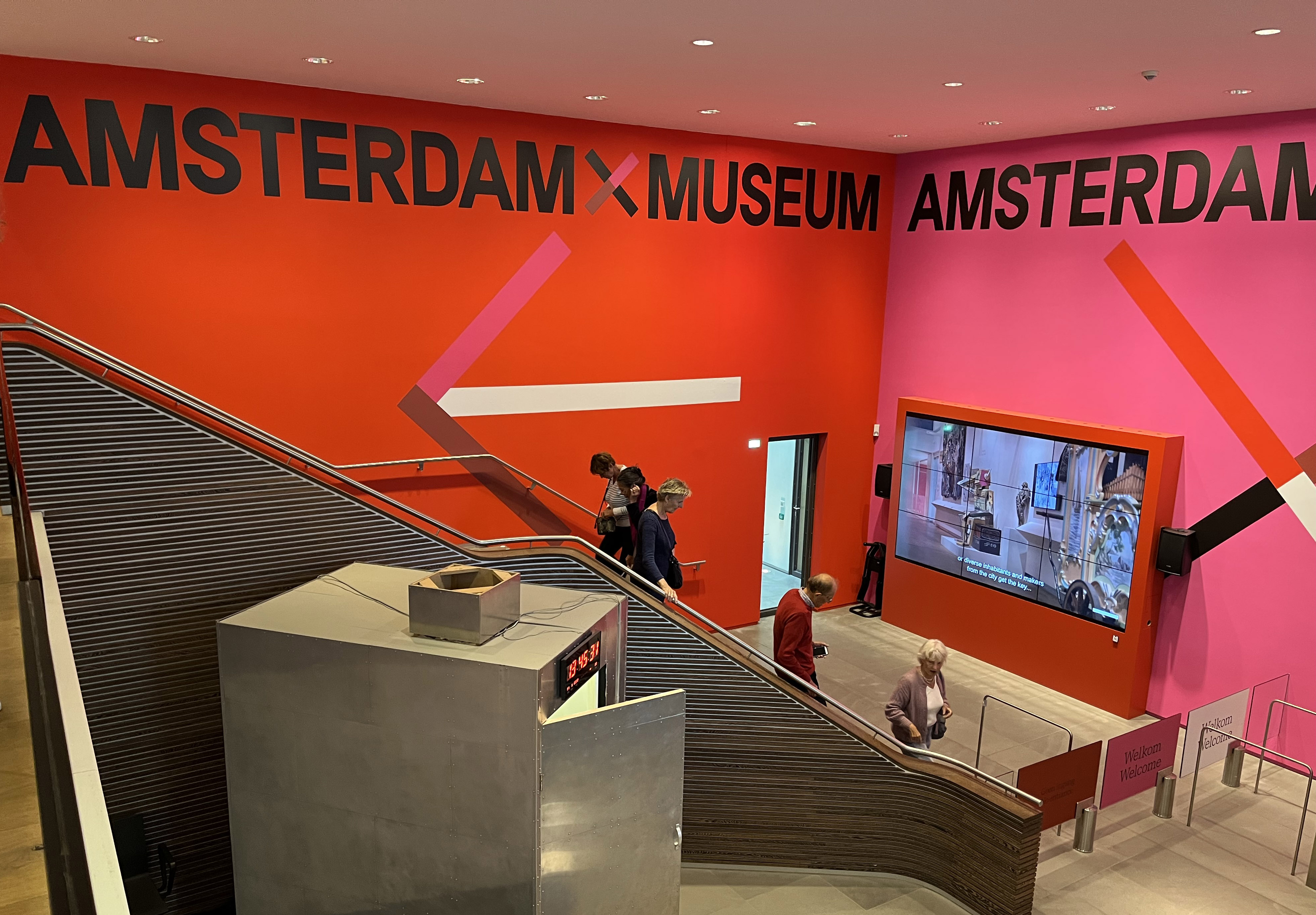
- Established: 1926
- Location: Amstelhof, Amstel, Amsterdam
- Type: Heritage centre, Official Museums of Amsterdam, ICOM
- Visitors: 199.322 (2010)
- Director: Judikje Kiers
- Website: www.amsterdammuseum.nl

The Amsterdam Museum, known until 2010 as the Amsterdam Historical Museum, is an Amsterdam-based museum dedicated to the city's past and present. Due to the renovation of its main location, the museum is temporarily located in the Amstelhof on the Amstel River, together with H'ART Museum and the dependence of the Museum van de Geest.

== History ==
The museum opened in 1926 in the Waag, one of Amsterdam's 15th-century city gates. It has been located since 1975 in a former convent that was used from 1581 onwards as Amsterdam's municipal orphanage. The building was extended by Hendrick and his son Pieter de Keyser, then rebuilt by Jacob van Campen in 1634. The orphanage operated in this building until 1960.

== Collection ==
The museum exhibits various items related to the history of Amsterdam, from the Middle Ages to the present time. Many of the original furnishings of the city orphanage are on display, as are artifacts relating to the Rasp house, the former house of correction in Amsterdam where the prisoners were forced to rasp wood to make sawdust. As of 2011, the museum manages 70,000 objects kept in various buildings and storage areas. Of those, approximately 25,000 have been photographed and are available to the public online. To celebrate the change of their name (dropping the word "Historical") and the 10th anniversary of Wikipedia on January 15, 2011, the museum "gave" Wikipedia a USB stick with the online photo collection to symbolize the public release of their high quality digital photographs made of their collection. This includes all two-dimensional objects that were already free of copyright, but new is the set photos of three-dimensional art.

The museum has on display paintings, models, archeological findings, photographs, but also less likely items such as a playable carillon, a Witkar (environment-friendly vehicle from the 1960s) and a replica of Café 't Mandje (a famous pub in the Red-light district where prostitutes, pimps, seamen and lesbian women came together).

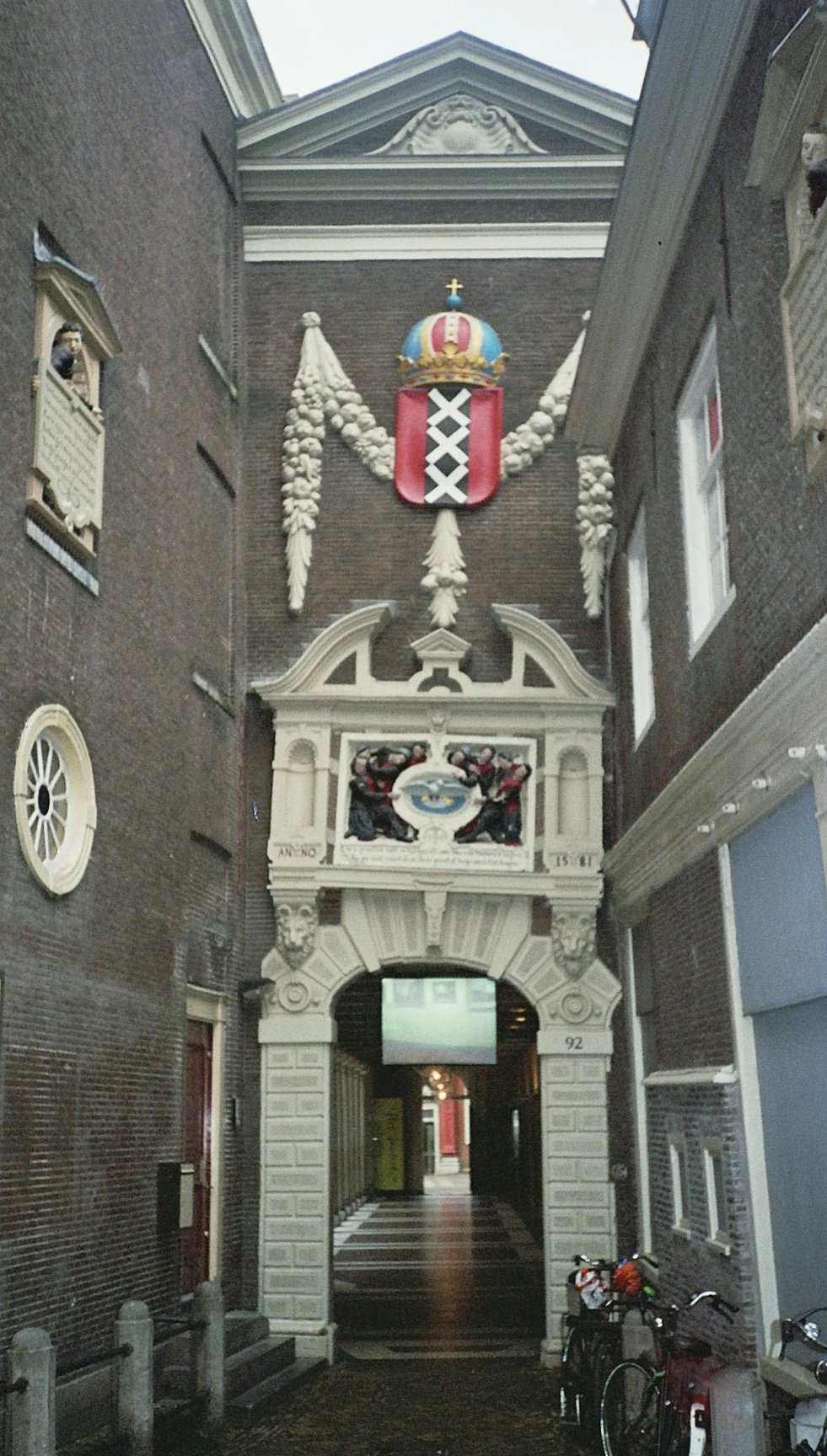
The coat of arms of Amsterdam above the entrance to the museum.

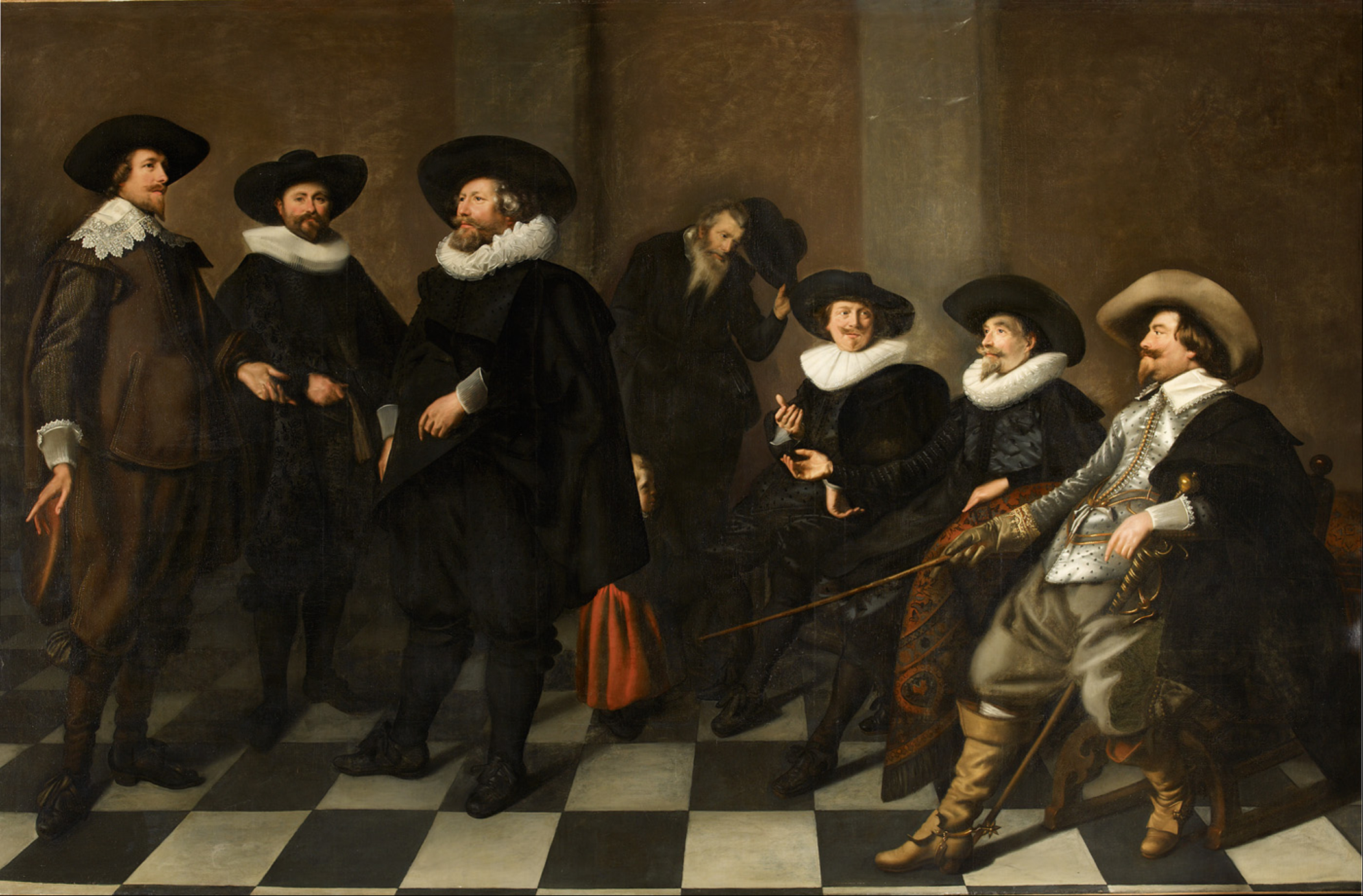
Regents of the old city orphanage, painting by Abraham de Vries can still be seen in the wall of the regent's room where it was installed in 1633.

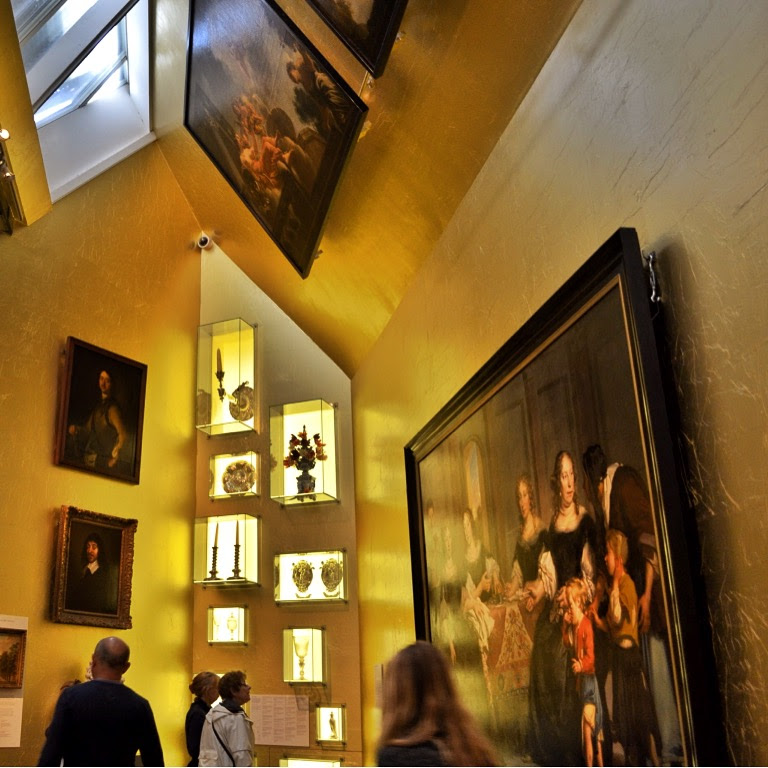
One of the modern galleries in Amsterdam Museum.
