= Regents group portrait =

Group portrait of regents of an organisation

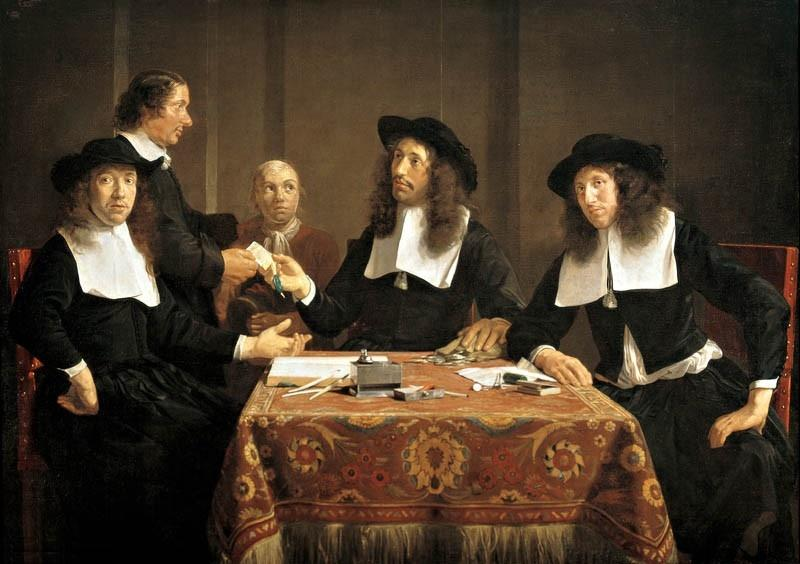
Jan de Bray, The regents of the Leproos-, Pest- en Dolhuis in Haarlem, 1667

A regents group portrait (regentenstuk or regentessenstuk in Dutch, literally "regents' piece"), is a group portrait of the board of trustees, called regents or regentesses, of a charitable organization or guild. This type of group portrait was popular in Dutch Golden Age painting during the 17th century, and in the 18th century. They were intended to be hung in the regentenkamer, the regents' meeting room, or another prominent location in the institution.

== Regents ==
The regents of a charitable organization (such as an orphanage, poorhouse, hospital or hofje) or guild were drawn from the regenten, the upper class of Dutch society. It was a prestigious honorary office, so the regents were keen to have themselves depicted in this role. The leading portraitists of the day were commissioned to make regentenstukken, including Rembrandt (whose Syndics of the Drapers' Guild is a subtle treatment of a group round a table), Frans Hals, Ferdinand Bol, and Bartholomeus van der Helst. The commissions proved lucrative, particularly since the regents only served for a few years, to be replaced with a new set of regents who were equally eager to be painted.

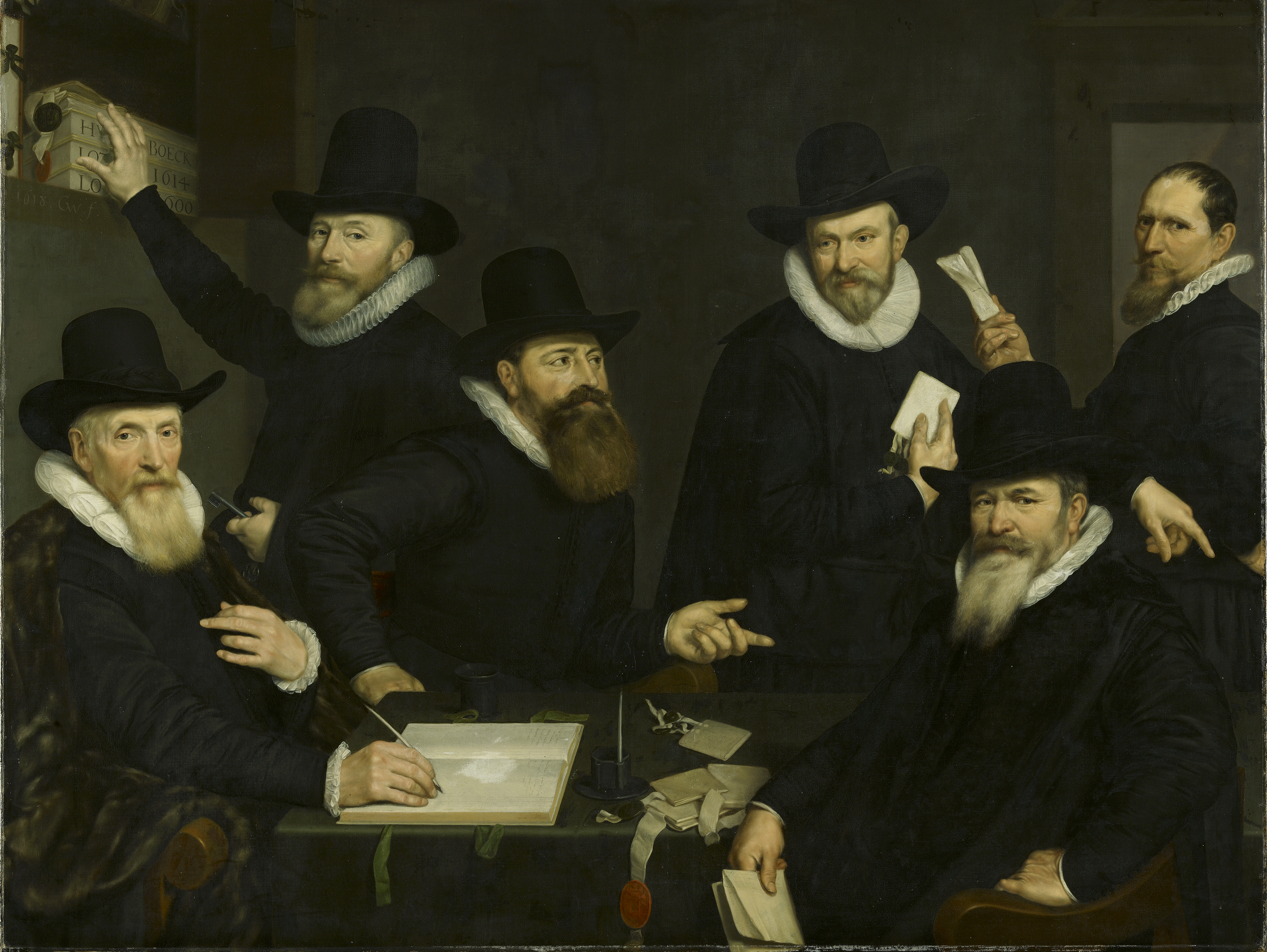
Cornelis van der Voort, The Regents of the Old Men's and Women's Home, 1617–1618

In some institutions the regentesses were all female, and so the portraits were of all-female groups, or there were mixed-gender regents who were painted separately, as in Hals' two portraits of the Regents and Regentesses of the Old Men's Almshouse. Occasionally the painting depicted not just the regents but also others, such as the binnenvader or binnenmoeder, who was in charge of the day-to-day operations. For instance, Abraham de Vries in 1633 painted a regentenstuk for the Burgerweeshuis orphanage in Amsterdam showing not only the regents but also the binnenvader leading in a young orphan girl.

== Regentenstukken ==
Group portraits, largely a Dutch invention, were popular among the large numbers of civic associations that were a notable part of Dutch life, such as the militia group portrait or schuttersstuk showing officers of a city's schutterij or militia guards, boards of trustees and regents of guilds and charitable foundations and the like. Cornelis van der Voort, an Amsterdam-based artist originally from Antwerp, is regarded as the inventor of the new genre of the regentenstukken as he started working on three such portraits just before 1617.

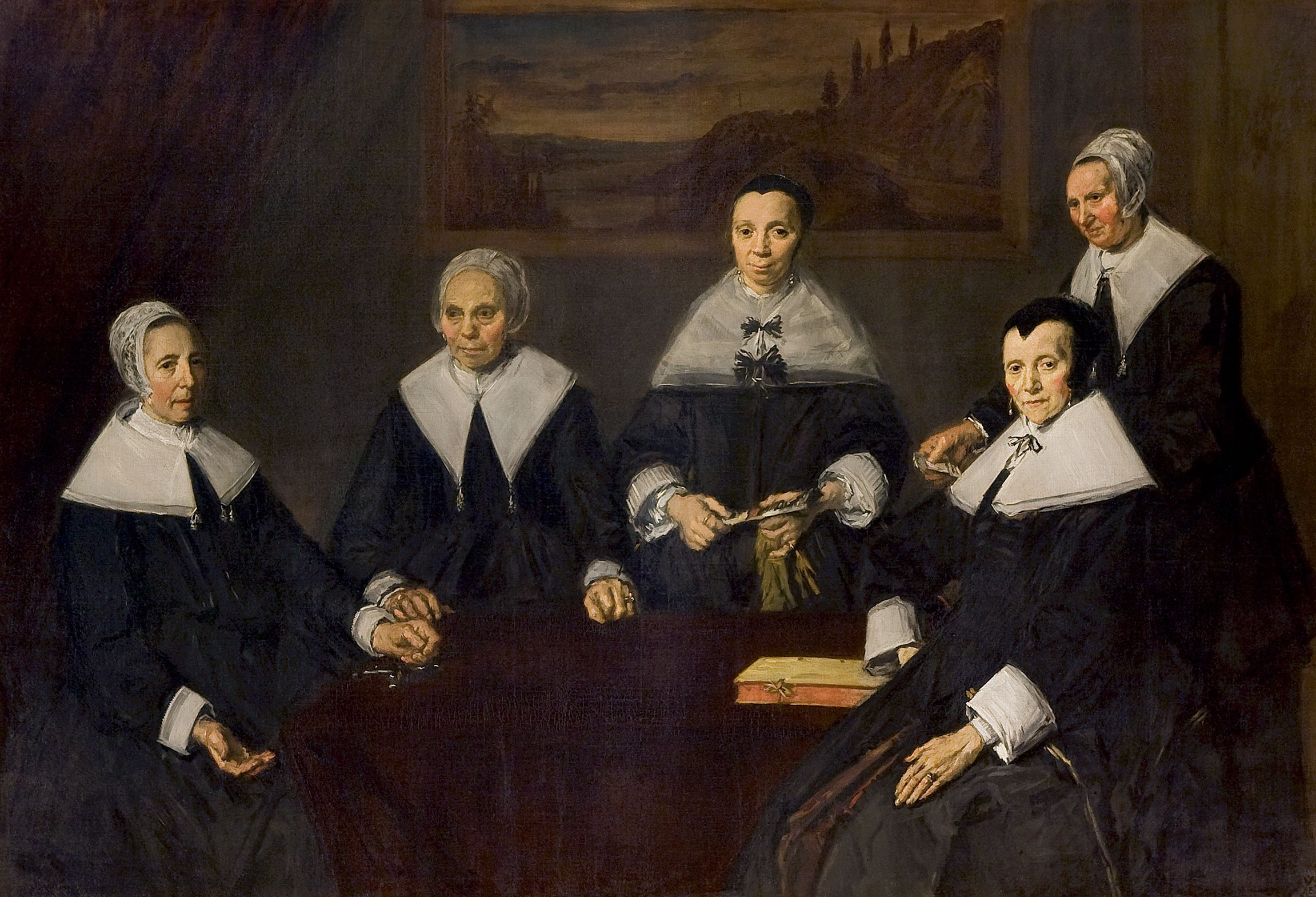
Frans Hals, Regentesses of the Old Men's Almshouse in Haarlem, 1664

Especially in the first half of the 17th century, portraits were very formal and stiff in composition. Boards of trustees preferred an image of austerity and humility, posing in dark clothing (which by its refinement testified to their prominent standing in society), often seated around a table, with solemn expressions on their faces. Scientists often posed with instruments and objects of their study around them. Groups were often seated around a table, each person looking at the viewer. Much attention was paid to fine details in clothing, and where applicable, to furniture and other signs of a person's position in society. Later in the century groups became livelier and colours brighter.

The cost of group portraits was usually shared by the subjects, often not equally. The amount paid might determine each person's place in the picture, either head to toe in full regalia in the foreground or face only in the back of the group. Sometimes all group members paid an equal sum, which was likely to lead to quarrels when some members gained a more prominent place in the picture than others.

In Amsterdam most of these paintings ultimately ended up in possession of the city council, and many are now on display in the Amsterdam Museum.

== Gallery ==
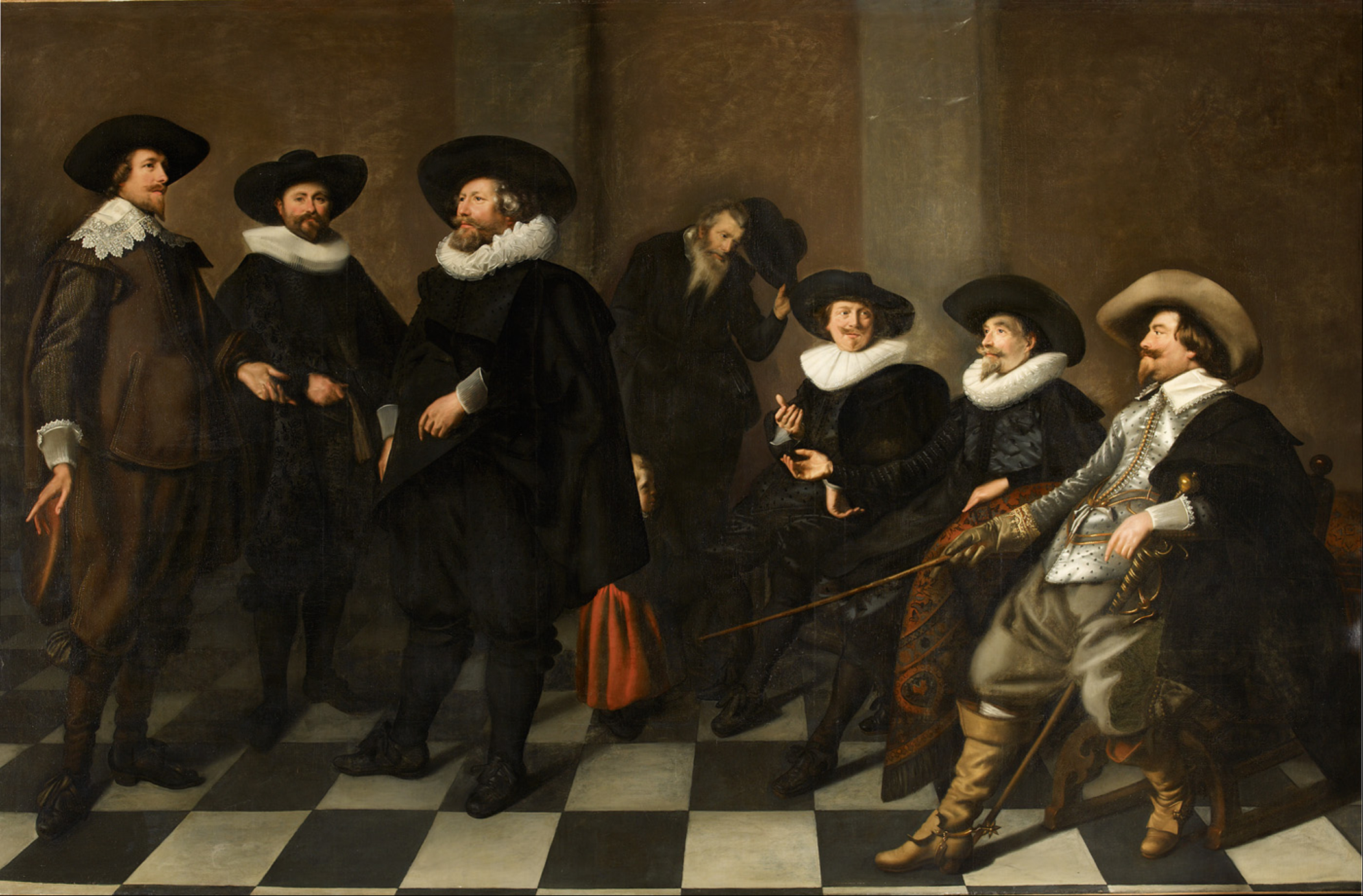
Abraham de Vries, Regents of the Burgerweeshuis orphanage in Amsterdam, 1633

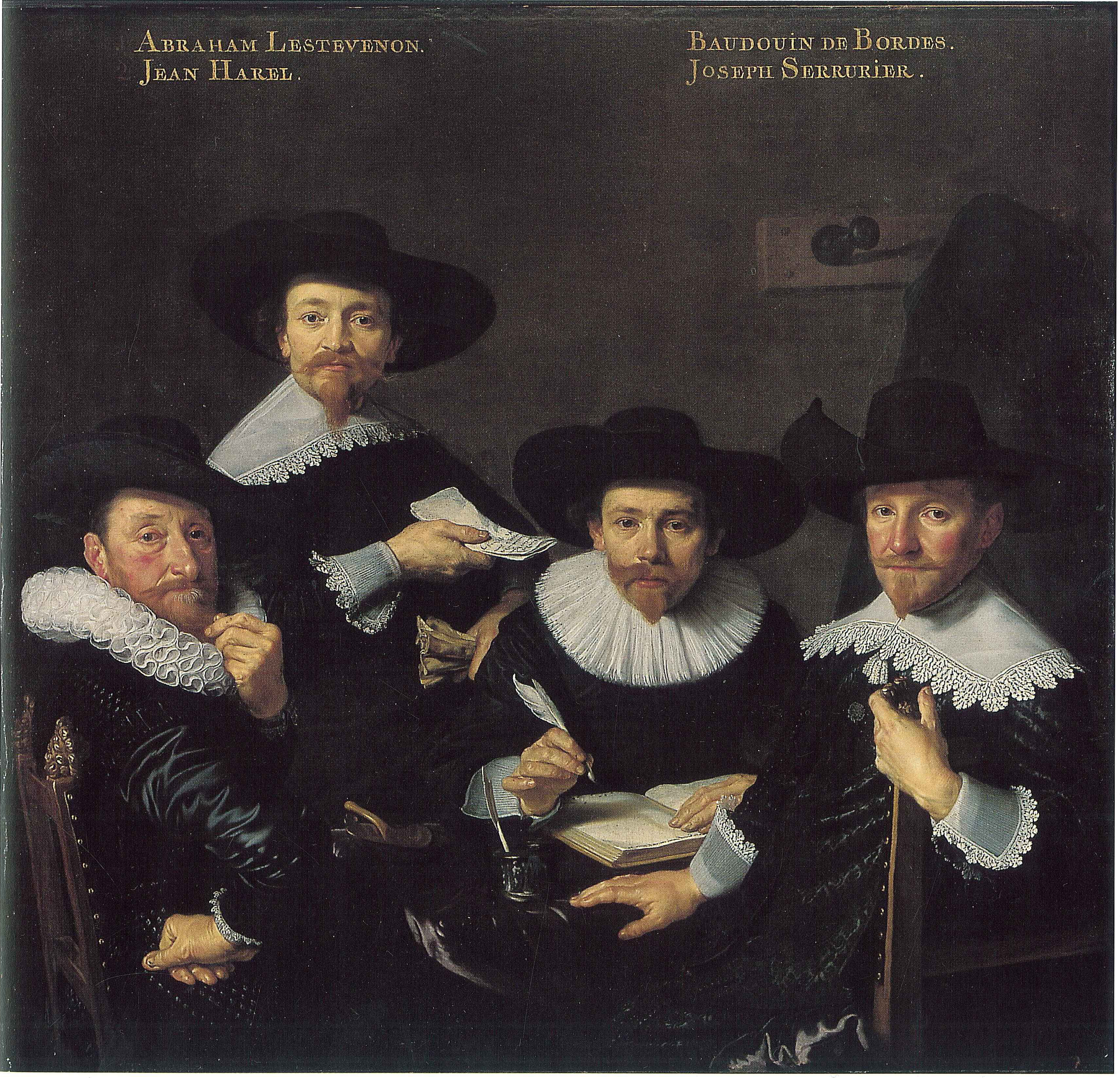
Bartholomeus van der Helst, Regents of the Walenweeshuis orphanage in Amsterdam, 1637

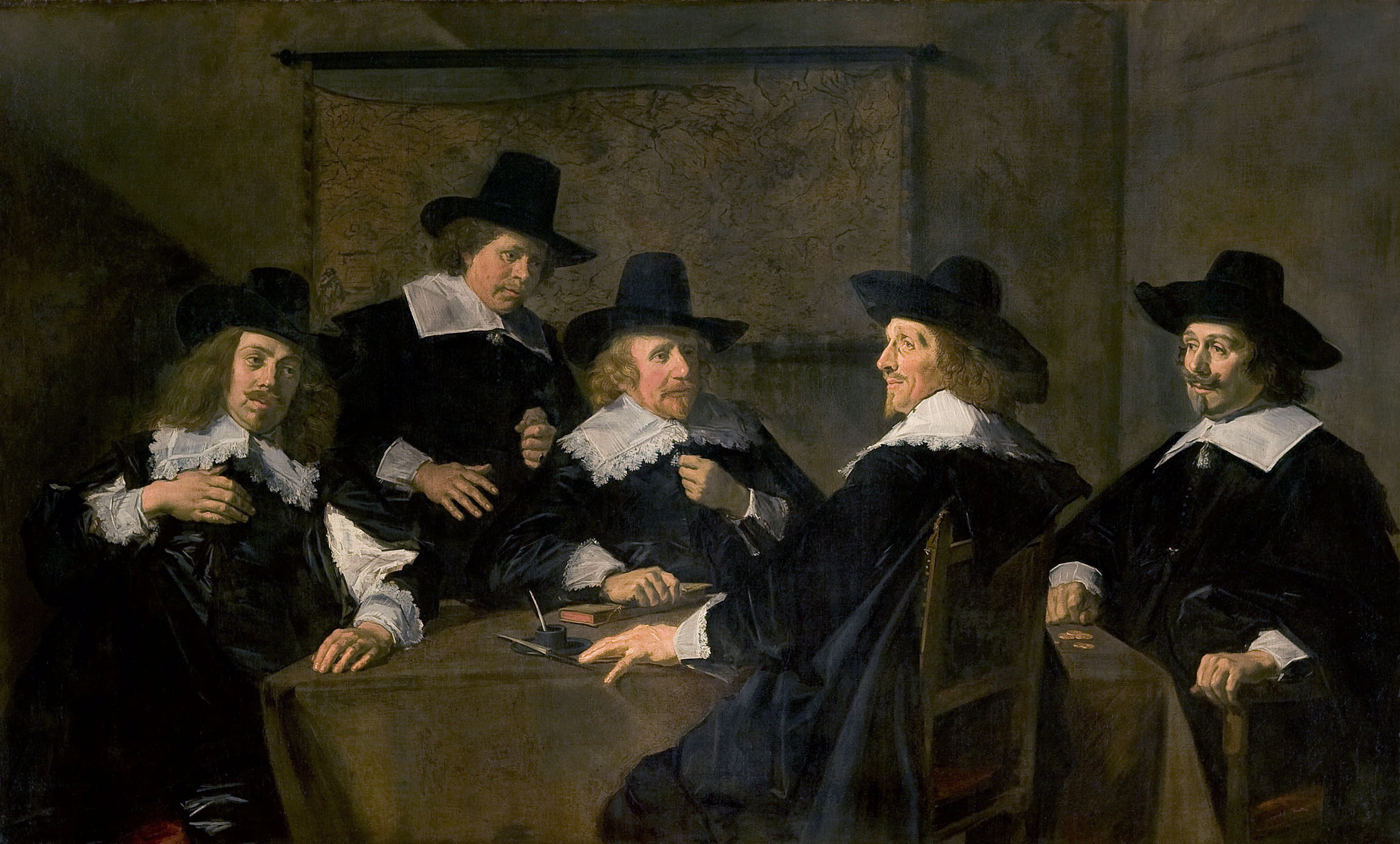
Frans Hals, Regents of the St. Elisabethgasthuis hospital in Haarlem, 1641

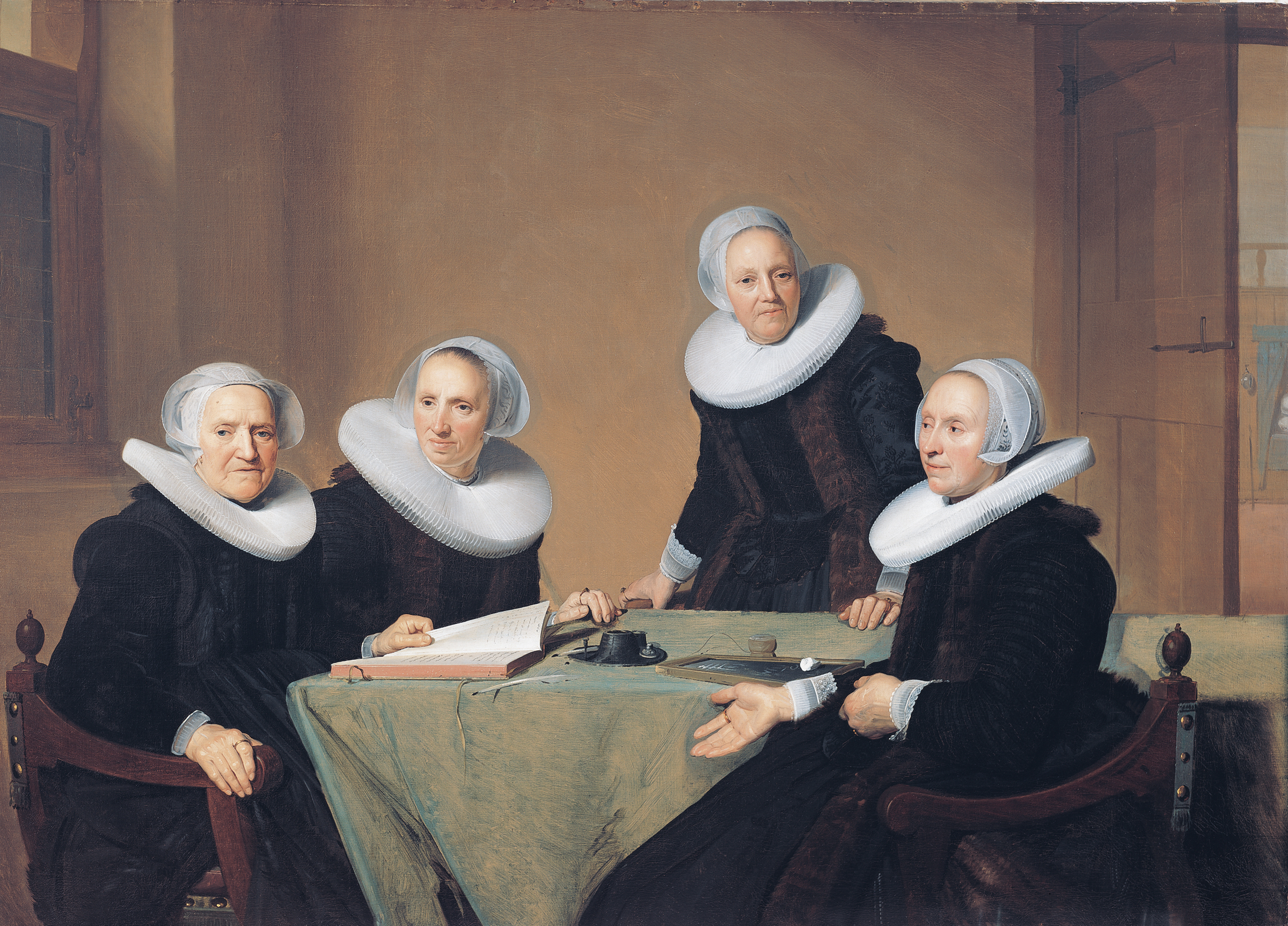
Johannes Cornelisz Verspronck, The Regentesses of the St. Elisabeth's Hospital in Haarlem, 1641

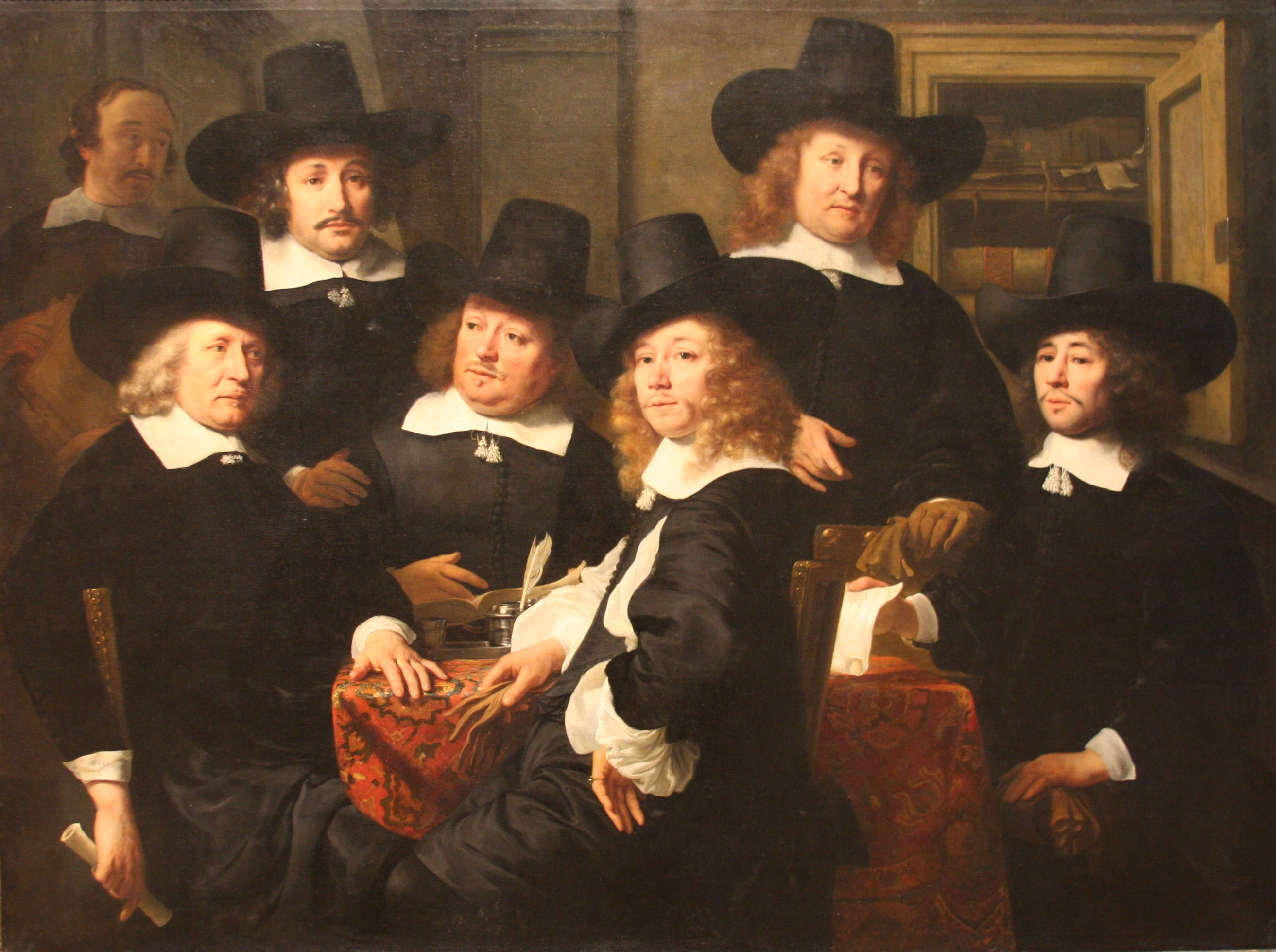
Ferdinand Bol, The six regents and the beadle of the Nieuwezijds Huiszittenhuis in Amsterdam, 1657

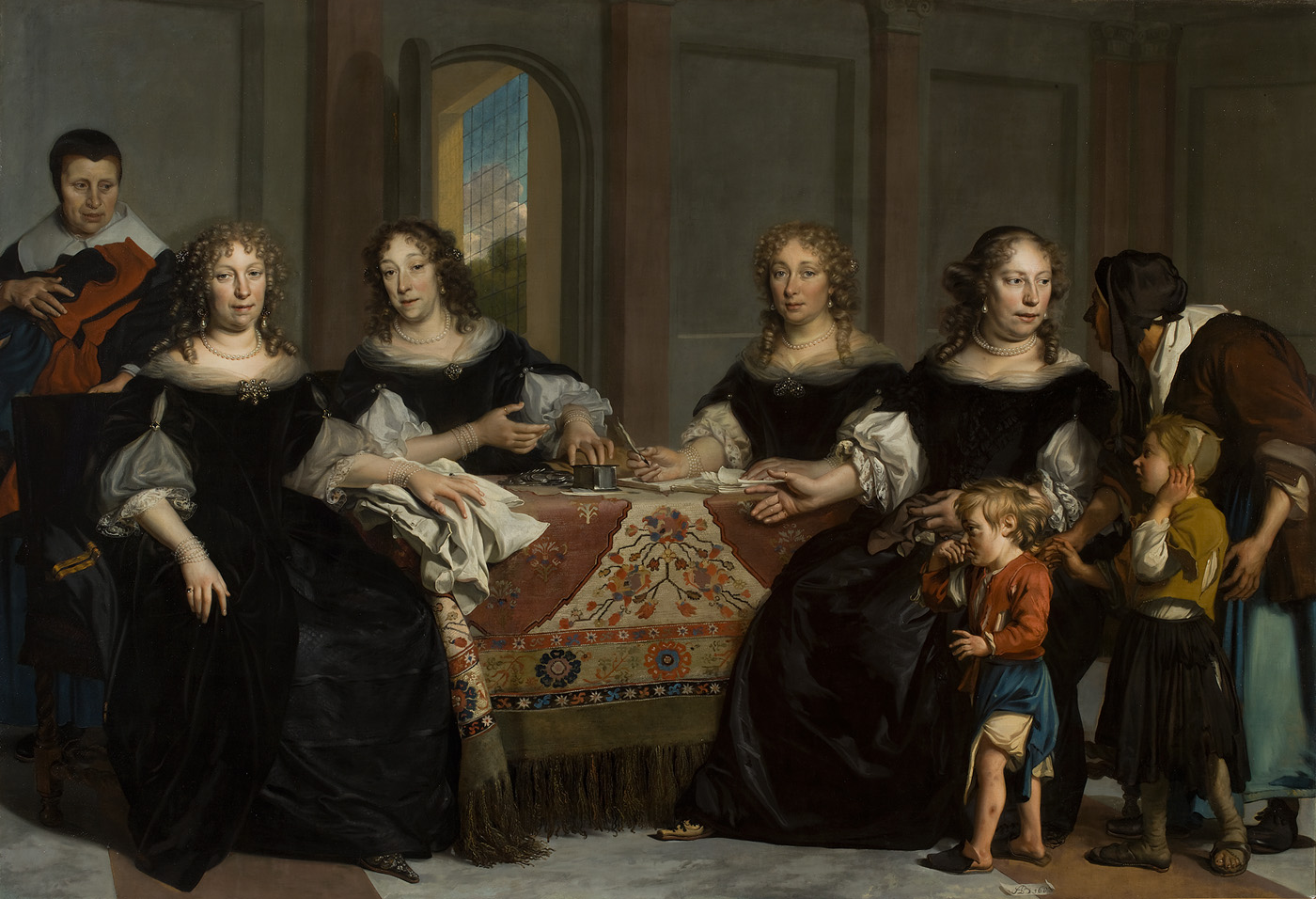
Adriaen Backer, Female regents of the Burgerweeshuis in Amsterdam, 1683

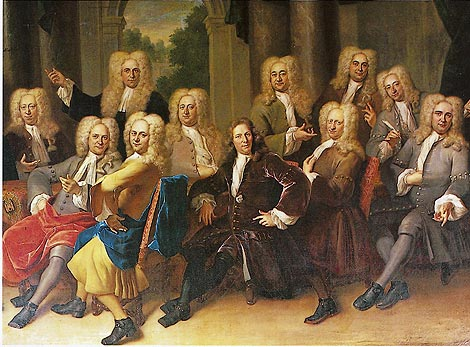
Jan Maurits Quinkhard, Regents of the Stadsambachtskinderhuis orphanage in Utrecht, 1731

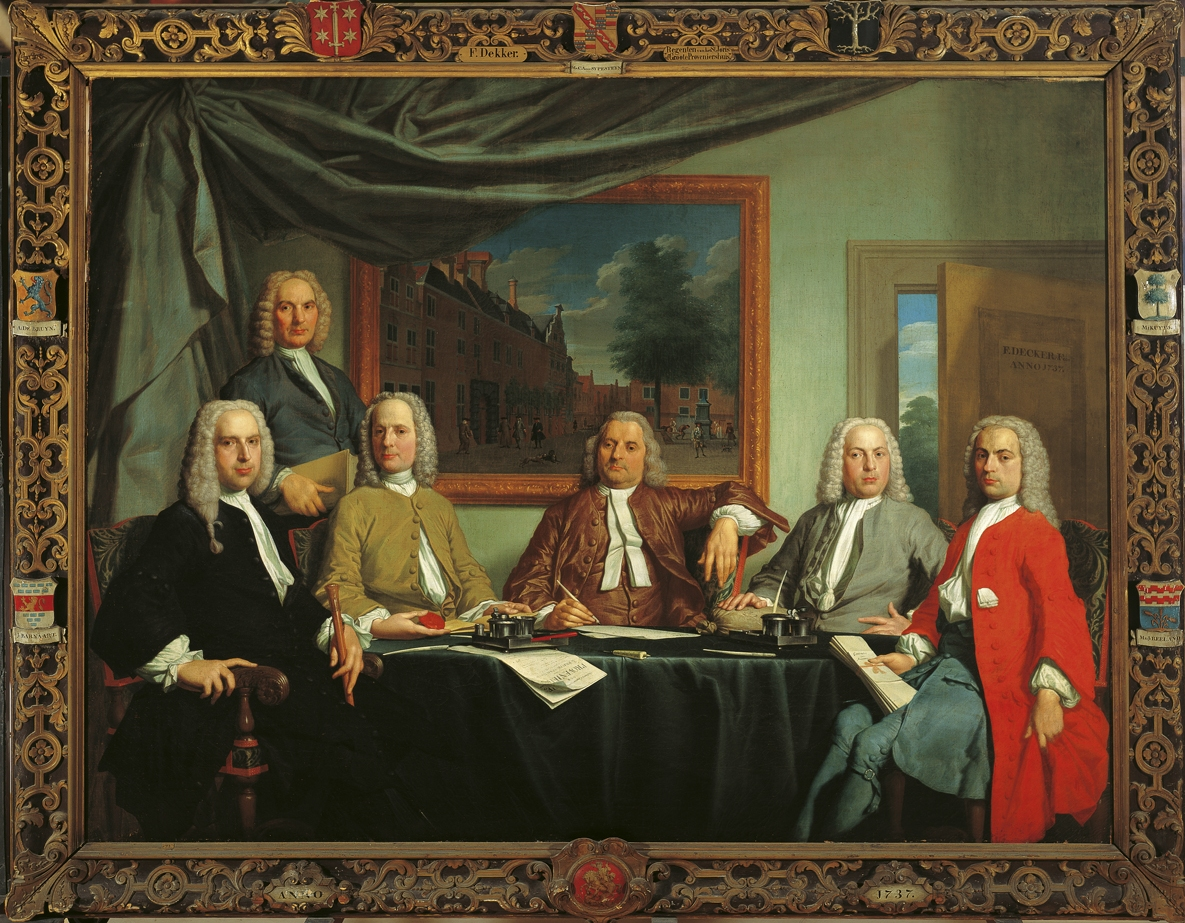
Frans Decker, Regents of the Proveniershuis retirement home in Haarlem, 1736
