= H'ART Museum =

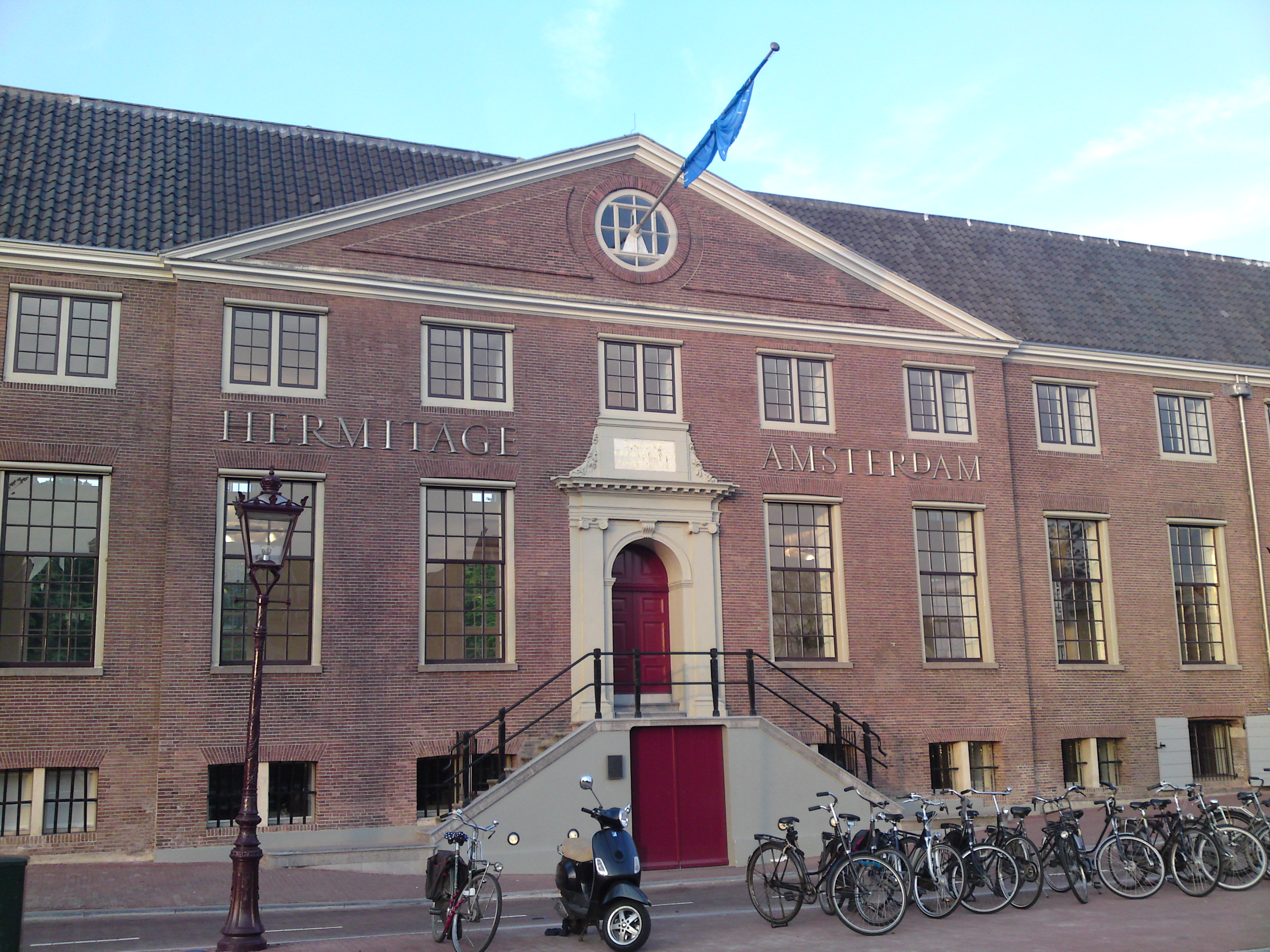
- Entrance of the H'ART Museum.

- Location within the city center of Amsterdam
- Established: 1682 (building); 2004 (museum)
- Location: Amstel 51; Amsterdam, Netherlands
- Coordinates: 52.365°N 4.9025°E
- Type: Art museum
- Visitors: 196,000 (2024)
- Director: Cathelijne Broers
- Public transit access: Waterlooplein; Metro: 51 , 53 , 54; Tram: 9 , 14
- Website: hartmuseum.nl/en/

H'ART Museum is an art museum located on the banks of the Amstel river in Amsterdam. Formerly a satellite of the Hermitage Museum of Saint Petersburg, Russia, the museum cut ties with the Hermitage after the Russian invasion of Ukraine in 2022.

== History ==
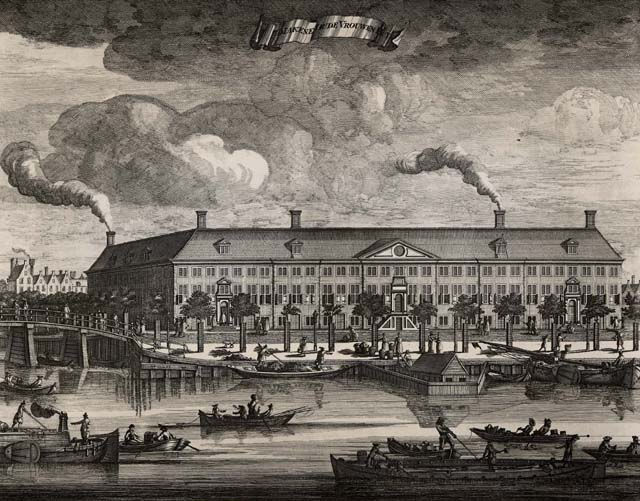
A 1693 etching of the Amstelhof, showing the building out of proportions.

The museum is housed in the former Amstelhof, a classical style building from 1681. The building opened in 1682 as a retirement home for elderly women under the name Diaconie Oude Vrouwen Huys (English: Deanery Home for Old Women) on the east bank of the river Amstel. From 1817, the facility housed both elderly men and women, and was renamed Diaconie Oude Vrouwen- en Mannenhuis (English: Deanery Home for Old Men and Women). The building was first named Amstelhof (English: Amstel Court) in 1953.

In the 1990s, operators of the facility decided that the building was inadequate to meet the modern needs of its residents and sought to build a new building elsewhere. They offered the historic building to the city of Amsterdam, who, in turn, leased it to the museum. The last inhabitants left the Amstelhof in 2007. On 20 June 2009, the museum was opened by Dutch Queen Beatrix and Russian president Dmitry Medvedev. The museum was open to the public the following day.

During the more than 300 years that residents were housed in the Amstelhof, several renovations took place on the building interior and wings were added to provide needed space. Thus, little of the original interior remained when work for the museum began. While some areas were restored to their original appearance, many existing walls were removed and spaces reconfigured to accommodate the museum's needs. The total cost of the renovations was €40 million.

The temporary museum in the Neerlandia Building on the Nieuwe Keizersgracht closed in 2008 to become the Hermitage for Children. It opened along with the main museum on 20 June 2009.

On 3 March 2022, the museum severed ties with the State Hermitage in St. Petersburg because of the Russian invasion of Ukraine, which began a week before. The museum changed its name to the H'ART Museum from 1 September 2023.

== Exhibitions ==
In 2023 the museum announced that it would be working with the Smithsonian, the Centre Pompidou and the British Museum to present exhibitions.

2023-2024 Julius Caesar - I came, I saw, I met my doom

=== Previous exhibitions ===
- The museum used to house two permanent presentations, one describes Netherlands–Russia relations and the other detailed the history of the Amstelhof building.
- The Immortal Alexander the Great The Myth, The Truth, His Journey, His Legacy, 18 September 2010 – 18 March 2011. Alexander the Great (356 BC – 323 BC, king from 336 BC) appeals to the imagination more than any ruler of the ancient age. Beginning in his youth he inspired those around him. During his campaigns in the East, Alexander searched for the origins of Dionysus, whom the ancient Greeks believed came from the exotic East, possibly India. He followed in the footsteps of Dionysus to reach countries such as Bactria, Egypt, India, Mongolia, Persia and Syria. Everywhere he went he established cities, naming many Alexandria, and left behind a legacy of Greek culture in the form of Hellenism. Alexander's fame lived long after antiquity as an example to many European, Russian and Islamic rulers. His life and history were depicted through paintings, tapestries and decorative art from classical antiquity to the modern age, of Western and non-Western origins.

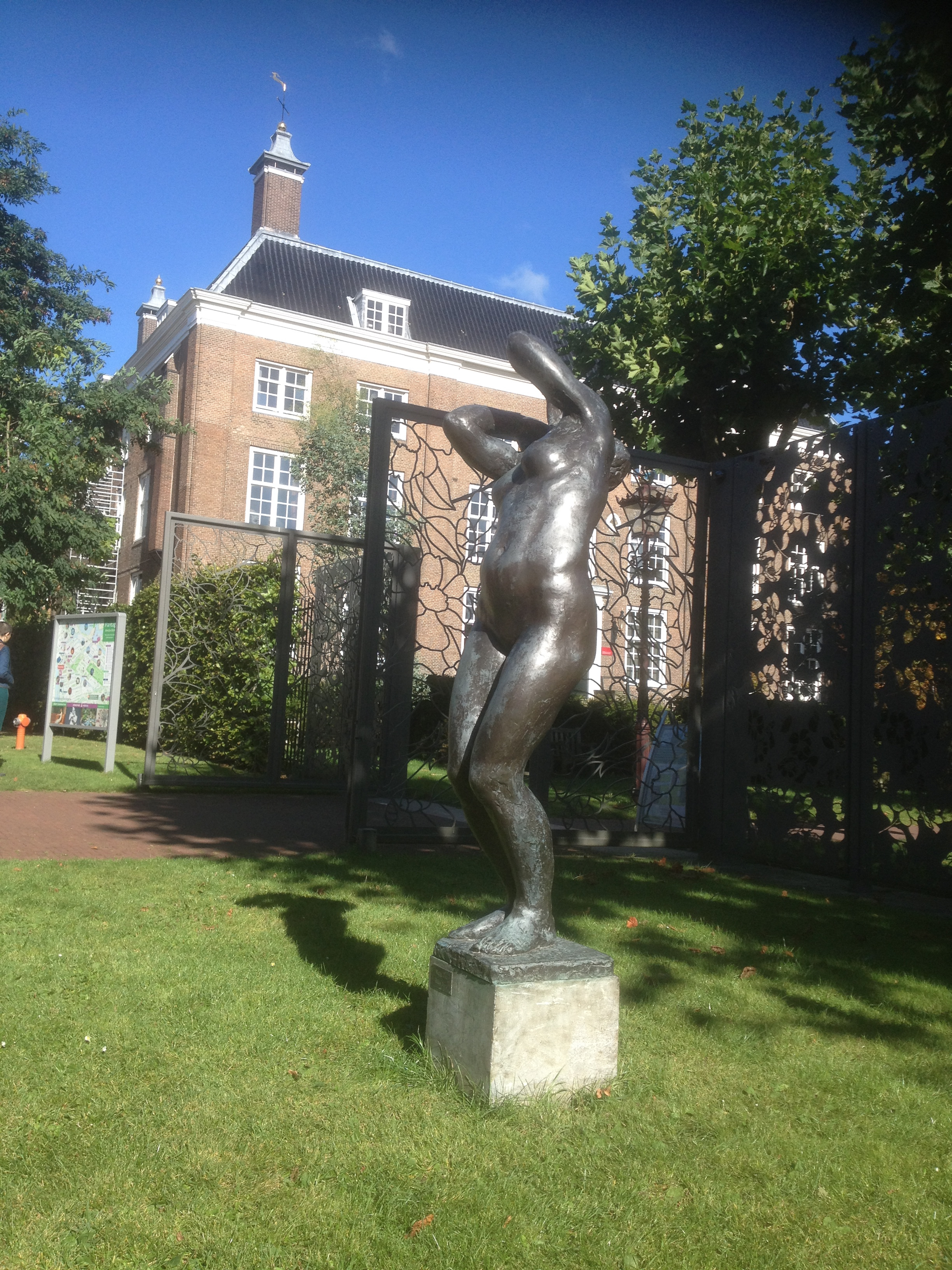
Katja, 1983 statue of a nude woman by sculptor Eddy Roos in the garden of H'ART museum

- Matisse to Malevich. Pioneers of Modern Art from the Hermitage 6 March to 17 September 2010. The exhibit was the first display in The Netherlands of works from the Hermitage Museum's collections of French paintings of the late 19th and early 20th century. The collection was started by Russian collectors Morozov and Shchukin. The exhibit contained hundreds of masterpieces by artists who pioneered Modernism, including Matisse, Van Dongen, De Vlaminck, Derain and Picasso. It looked at the concept of Modernism from a historical perspective and examined how artists joined the new movement. The guest curator for the exhibit was Henk van Os, Professor at the University of Amsterdam and chairman of the Specialists Council of the Hermitage Amsterdam. The museum is planning a sequel exhibition that will examine the origins of this modern art through a display of works by Impressionists from the Hermitage.
- Jewels! The Glitter of the Russian Court. In September 2019 the jubilee exhibition Jewels! The Glitter of the Russian Court began, which was meant both to celebrate 10 years of educating the Dutch public about the collections in St. Petersburg and to explain the relationships of the Russian nobility to the current Dutch royalty. After a successful start, the exhibition was closed during the coronavirus lockdown and, despite two extensions, did not manage to achieve the footfall necessary for income. The fact that Hermitage Amsterdam has no collection of its own made any rescue funding impossible, and an appeal to the public was made in 2021.
