= Abraham de Vries (painter) =

Dutch painter

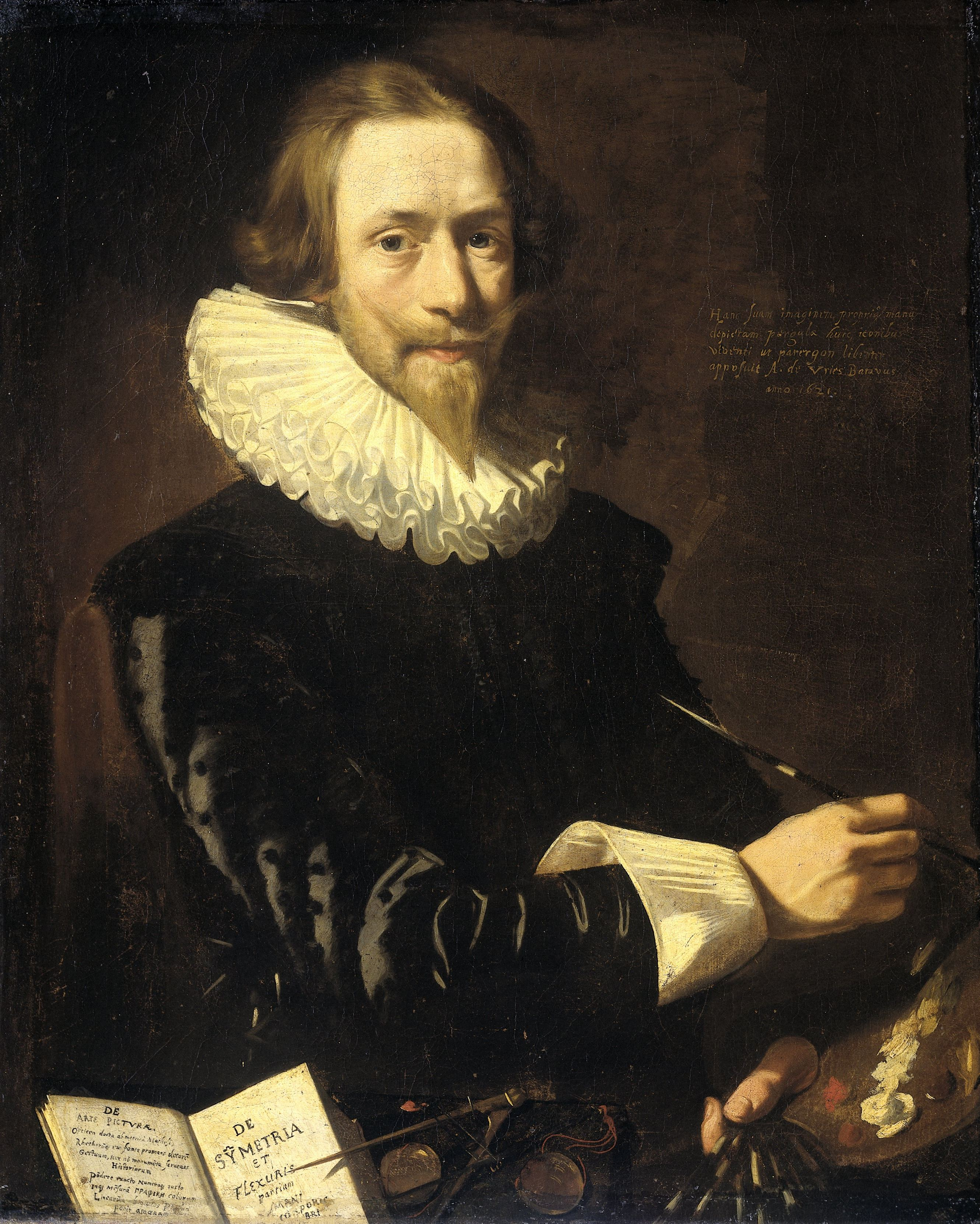
Self-portrait, 1621

Abraham de Vries (c. 1590 – 1649 or 1650) was a Dutch painter who was one of the leading portraitists of his age. As he led a peripatetic lifestyle and worked in France, Antwerp and the Dutch Republic his stylistic qualities are difficult to pin down.

== Life ==
Little is known about the early life and training of Abraham de Vries. It is now generally believed that the artist was born in The Hague since when he joined the Guild of Saint Luke of The Hague in 1644 he paid the fees of a native son of the city. In the past he was mistakenly believed to have been a native of Rotterdam. He may have travelled to France as early as 1613 if the date on a landscape drawing made in Lyon that year is correct. By 1617 the artist was registered in the Rotterdam church administration.

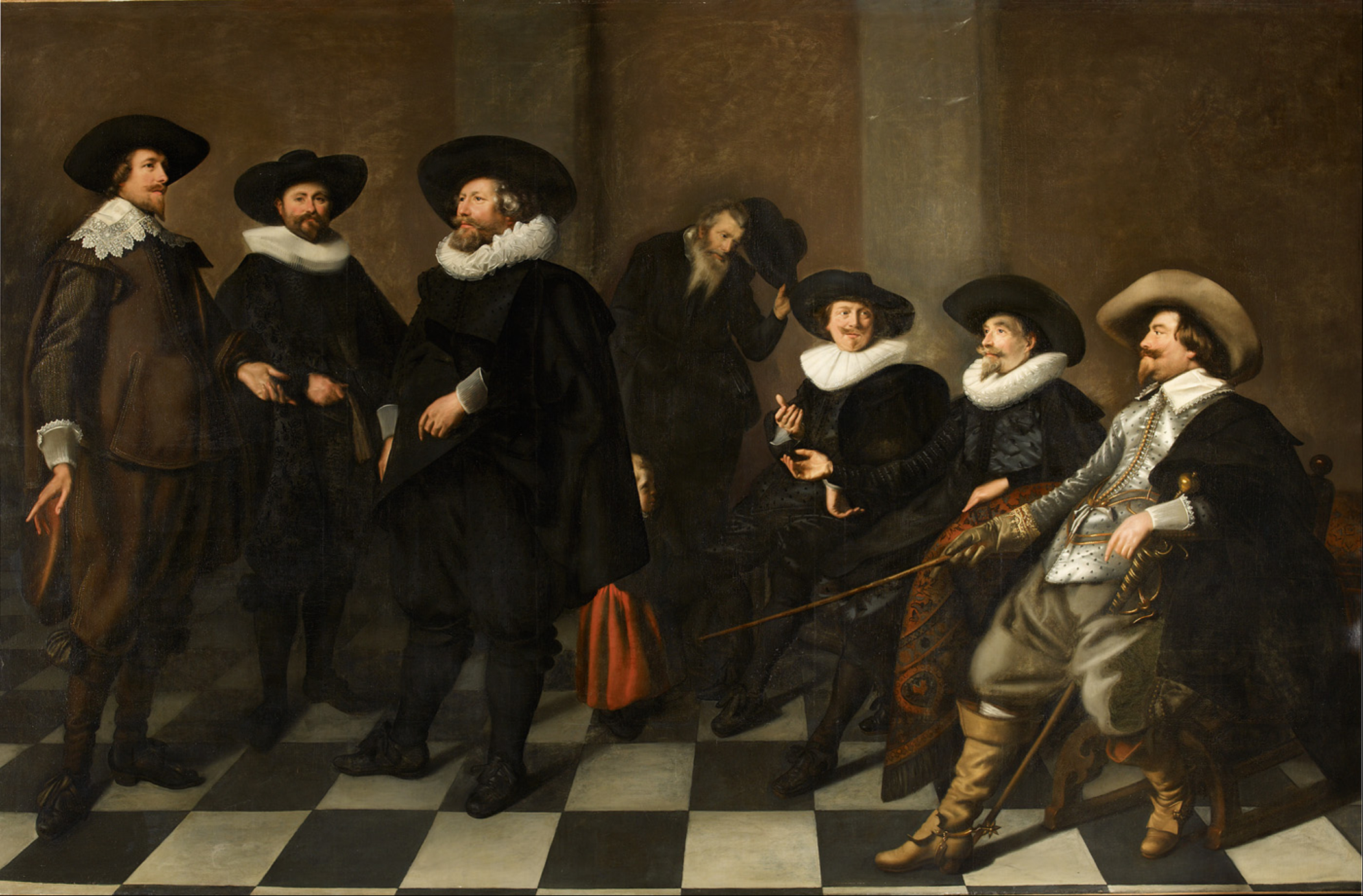
The regents of the city orphanage in Amsterdam

De Vries traveled to Southern France (and possibly Italy) in the 1620s. During his period of residence in Aix-en-Provence around 1623-1624 he was the teacher of the Flemish artist Jan Cossiers who had travelled from his native Antwerp to the south of France. De Vries also spent time in Toulouse, Montpellier (1625), Bordeaux (1626) and Paris (1627–1628). During his stay in France he became acquainted with the prominent French scientist and humanist Nicolas-Claude Fabri de Peiresc who was a close friend of Rubens. De Vries met Rubens in person in 1629 during a stay in Paris.

After his return north, he later made several trips to Paris and Antwerp. He was recorded in Antwerp in 1628 and again in 1634 when he became a member of the local Guild of Saint Luke in July 1634. The Cardinal-Infante Ferdinand of Austria who was the Governor of the Spanish Netherlands saw a portrait by de Vries during his visit to Antwerp on 20 April 1635. This led to an invitation to work in the Brussels court city where his work was deemed superior to that of Anthony van Dyck. He was in Brussels in 1636 as testified by his inscription on a portrait which states it was made in Brussels.

In 1639-1640 there are records of de Vries’ presence in Rotterdam. He was recorded in The Hague in 1643 and he became a member of the Guild of Saint Luke of The Hague in 1644. He made his will in The Hague in 1648. Various sources indicate that de Vries died in either 1649 or 1650 in The Hague.

== Work ==
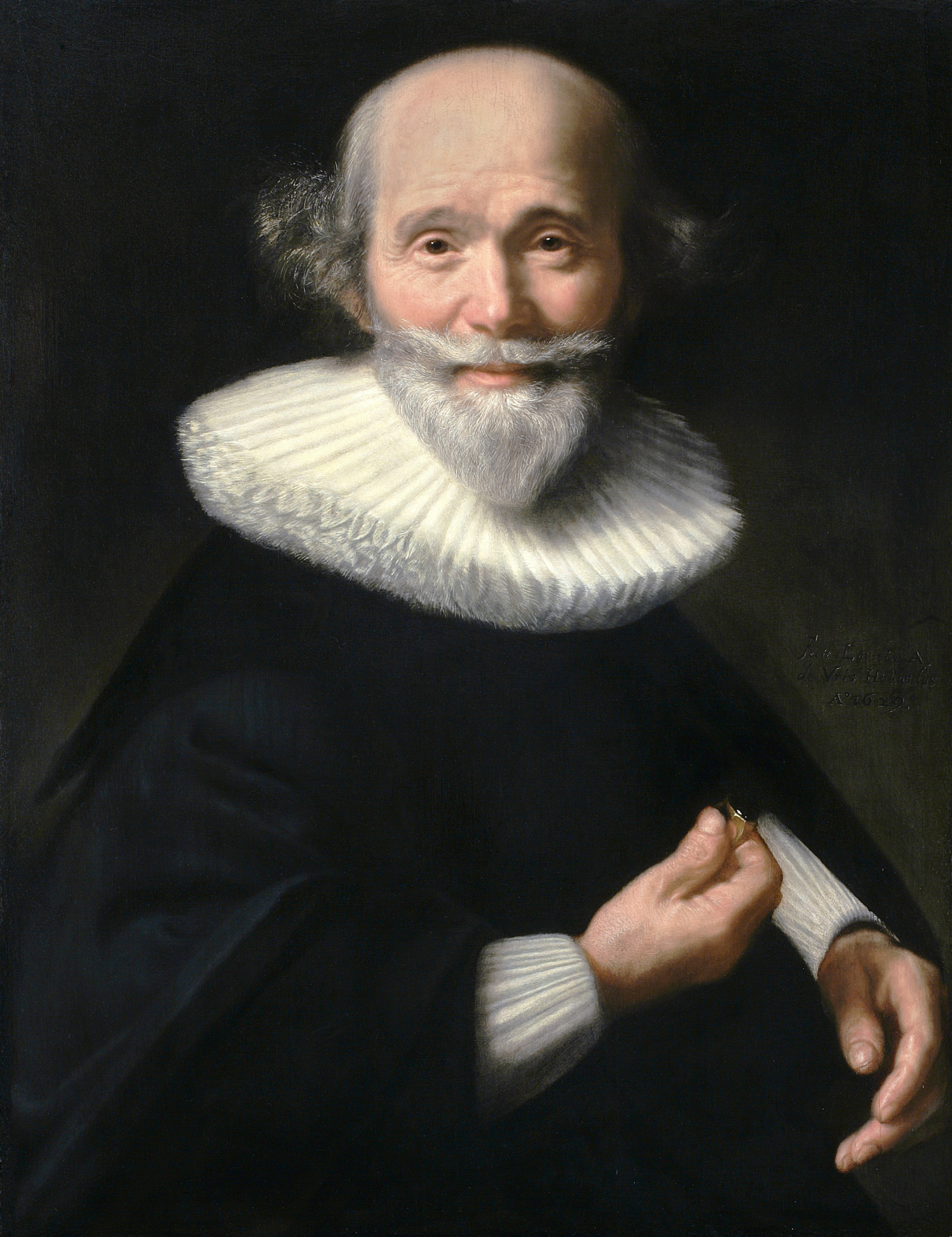
Portrait of a man holding a ring

Abraham de Vries is mainly known for his portraits even though he reportedly also created some landscapes. An example of his landscapes is an early Mountainous landscape with a wooden bridge (1613, Prentenkabinet, Rijksmuseum, Amsterdam), a drawing which was probably created during a stay in Lyon in France.

His early works are reminiscent of the works of contemporary artists in Amsterdam and The Hague such as Thomas de Keyser and Jan van Ravesteyn. In his 1621 Self portrait, the artist depicted himself as a learned painter. In the late 1620s to the 1630s there was clearly a Flemish influence recognizable in his portraits as is seen in the Portrait of Simon de Vos of 1634 (Maagdenhuismuseum, Antwerp). This portrait of the Antwerp painter Simon de Vos shows a dynamism akin to that visible in the portraits of van Dyck. A similar Flemish feistiness can be seen in his Portrait of a man holding a ring of 1629 (Musée du Petit Palais, Avignon). The textured description of skin and soft handling of hair from the mid-1630s onwards show the influence of Antwerp portrait painters of that period. The combination in his portraits of Dutch and Flemish characteristics is not unlike what is apparent in the work of artists working in The Hague such as Adriaen Hanneman.

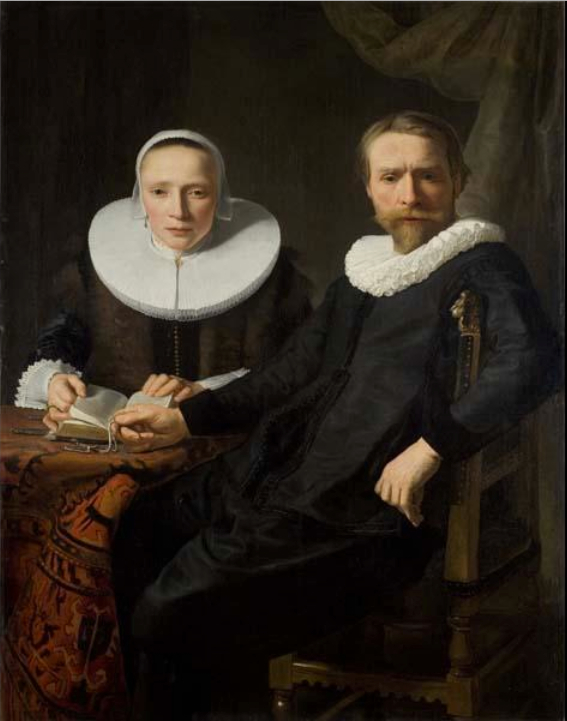
A double portrait

By the 1640s the Amsterdam art scene had come under the spell of Rembrandt's portrait art. Rembrandt's portraits emphasized the character and personality of his sitters through their physiognomy rather than by means of symbols and iconography. Abraham de Vries could also not resist the influence of this new painting style in his portraits. The influence was so strong that his Portrait of a Dutch gentleman (1647, National Gallery of Victoria, Melbourne) was for some time mistakenly attributed to Rembrandt.

Abraham de Vries also painted so-called 'regents group portraits', i.e. group portraits of the board of trustees, called regents or regentesses, of a charitable organization or guild. An example of his original approach to this genre, which was very popular in Dutch Golden Age painting, is his Regents of the Burgerweeshuis orphanage in Amsterdam (1633, Amsterdam Museum). Pictured in the group portrait are the regents who were responsible for the major renovation of the Burgerweeshuis orphanage in Amsterdam during the years 1630–1634. The arrangement of the composition is very original: de Vries split the regents in two groups: one group on the left-hand side is composed of standing figures and the other on the right-hand side consists of sitting figures. In the background in the middle of the composition a member of staff of the orphanage leads a small orphan girl into the room and thereby links up the two groups. Abraham de Vries may have been the first artist to introduce a child as an "attribute" in a regents group portrait. The portrait of the regents is still ‘’in situ’’ on the wall for which it was designed in the regent's room of the orphanage.

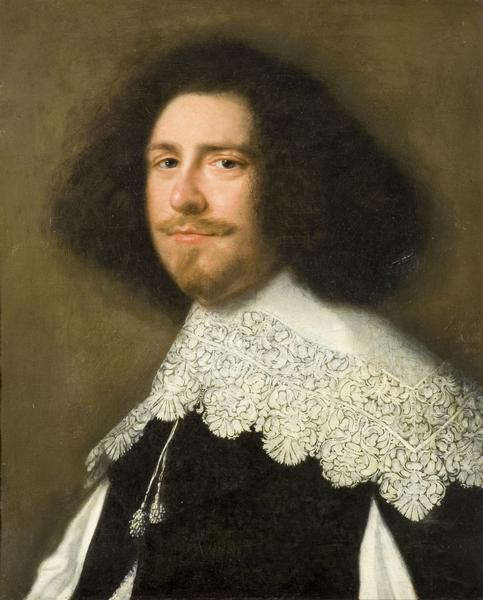
Portrait of a Gentleman

In the Portrait of a Gentleman (1630–1640, Beecroft Art Gallery) de Vries employed a unique technique to render the sitter's broad lace collar: he applied the paint with his thumb. Close examination reveals his thumbprints still visible in the paint. He painted several wedding portraits in which the man is situated on the left and the woman on the right, which was unusual for that time.
