= Cornelis van der Voort =

Dutch painter (c. 1576–1624)

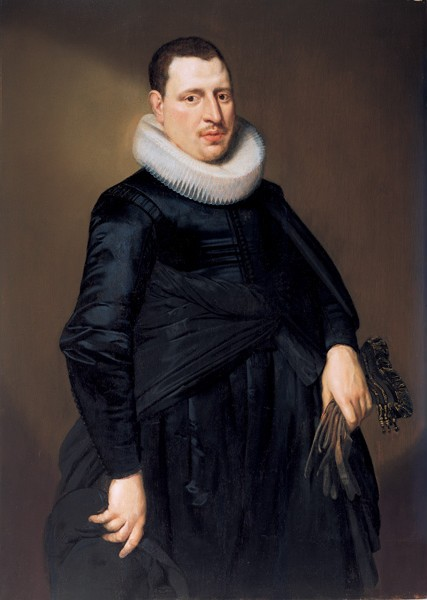
Portrait of a man

Cornelis van der Voort or van der Voorde (c. 1576 – buried on 2 November 1624) was a Dutch portrait painter, art collector, art appraiser and art dealer from the early 17th century who was active in Amsterdam. He painted individual portraits as well as group portraits including schuttersstukken depicting local militia members and regentenstukken depicting regents of charitable institutions, a genre of which van der Voort was the inventor. He played an important role in the development of portrait painting in the early 17th-century Dutch Republic. He is particularly noted for introducing the life-size, full-length format to Dutch portraiture.

== Life ==
Very little is known about van der Voort's early life. He was likely born around 1576 in Antwerp in the Habsburg Netherlands as the son of Pieter van der Voort, a cloth weaver by trade. The family van der Voort moved to the Northern Netherlands in 1585, likely fleeing Antwerp because they were Calvinists. His father received his citizenship of Amsterdam in 1592. It is not known with whom he studied painting. Aert Pietersz and Cornelis Ketel are considered likely masters.

As a young man he was praised by the leading art historian and theorist Karel van Mander. In 1606 his brother Hans, a tailor, bought three parcels on which two houses were built. Hans moved into the one on the corner, and Cornelis in the one next to it. Only a few years later Cornelis sold the house. In 1639 Rembrandt and his wife Saskia van Uylenburgh moved in. Today it is the Rembrandt House Museum.

Around 1613 he was a member of a schutterij in Amsterdam and painted a few schuttersstukken. In 1619 he was the head of the Guild of St. Luke. At some time before 1620 he inherited the house on the corner of the Sint Antoniesbreestraat from his brother.

Van der Voort probably had seven children and married twice: in 1598 with Geertrui Willems, who died in 1609, and in 1613 with Cornelia Brouwers. He died in Amsterdam and was buried on 2 November 1624. In August 1625 his inventory was sold. In 1626 his art business was taken over by Hendrick van Uylenburgh. His widow moved to Leiden.

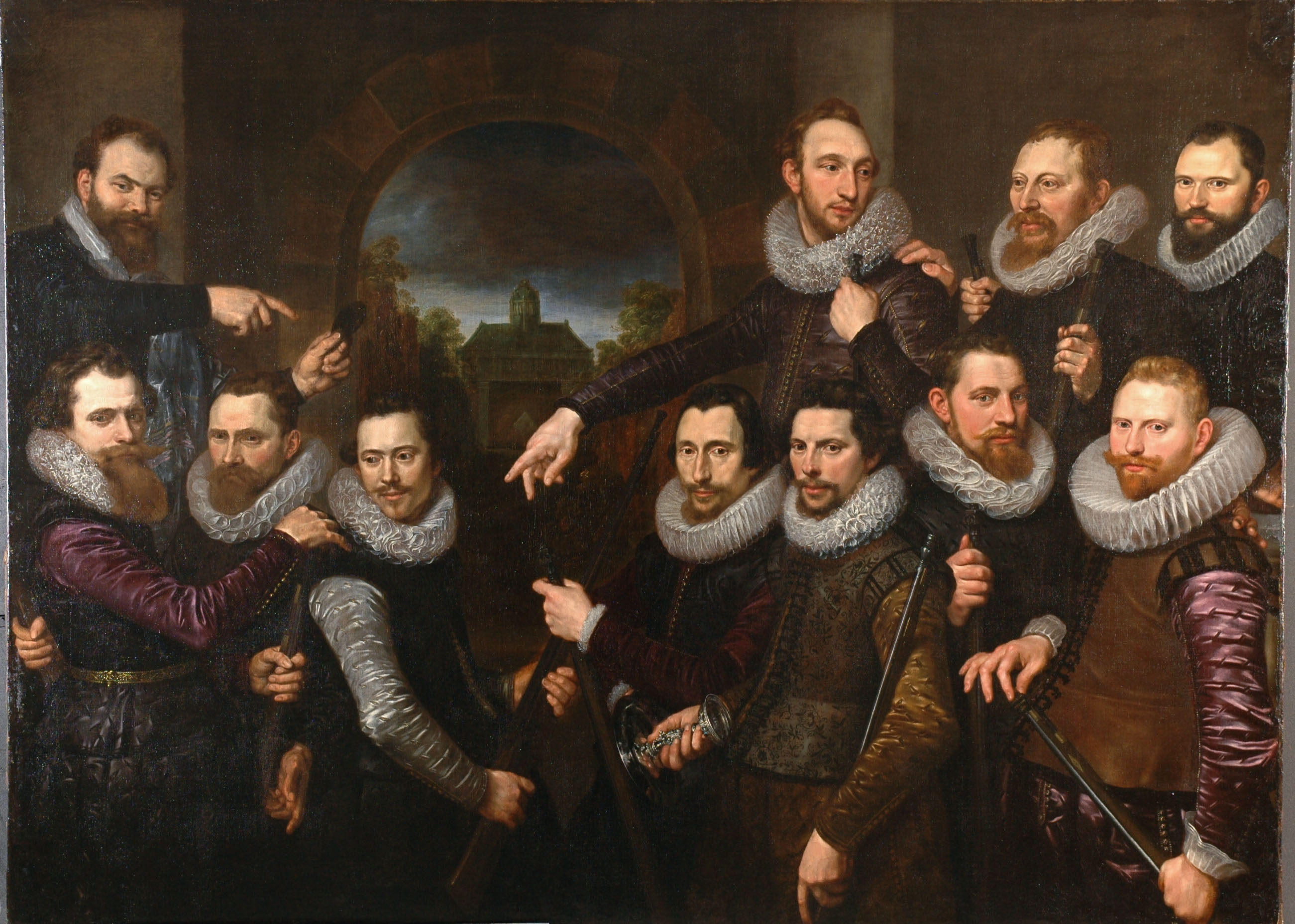
Schuttersstuk

== Work ==
Van der Voort painted full-length portraits in contemporary interiors: e.g. of Jan Cornelisz. Geelvinck as one of the regenten of a hospital, of Joan Huydecoper and his late wife and of Nicolaes Tulp. His work was in great demand and held in high esteem.

He had a strong influence on the early portraits of Rembrandt, as well as the work of Nicolaes Eliasz. Pickenoy and Thomas de Keyser. His own students included David Bailly, who copied his collection of paintings, Pieter Luyx, Dirk Harmensz. and probably Pieter Codde.

== Sources ==
- Peter C. Sutton, "Frans Hals", exhibition catalogue Museum of Fine Arts, Boston, Prized Possessions, European Paintings from Private Collections of Friends of the Museum of Fine Arts, Boston 17 July – 16 August 1992, p. 167.
- Judikje Kiers and Fieke Tissink, "Companion Pieces" exhibition catalogue Rijksmuseum, Amsterdam, The Glory of the Golden Age, 15 April – 17 September 2000, p. 31.
- Gary Schwartz (1987) Rembrandt. Zijn leven, zijn schilderijen, p. 26, 30, 138, 139, 141, 174, 210, 213.
