= Regentesses of the Old Men's Almshouse =

Painting by Frans Hals

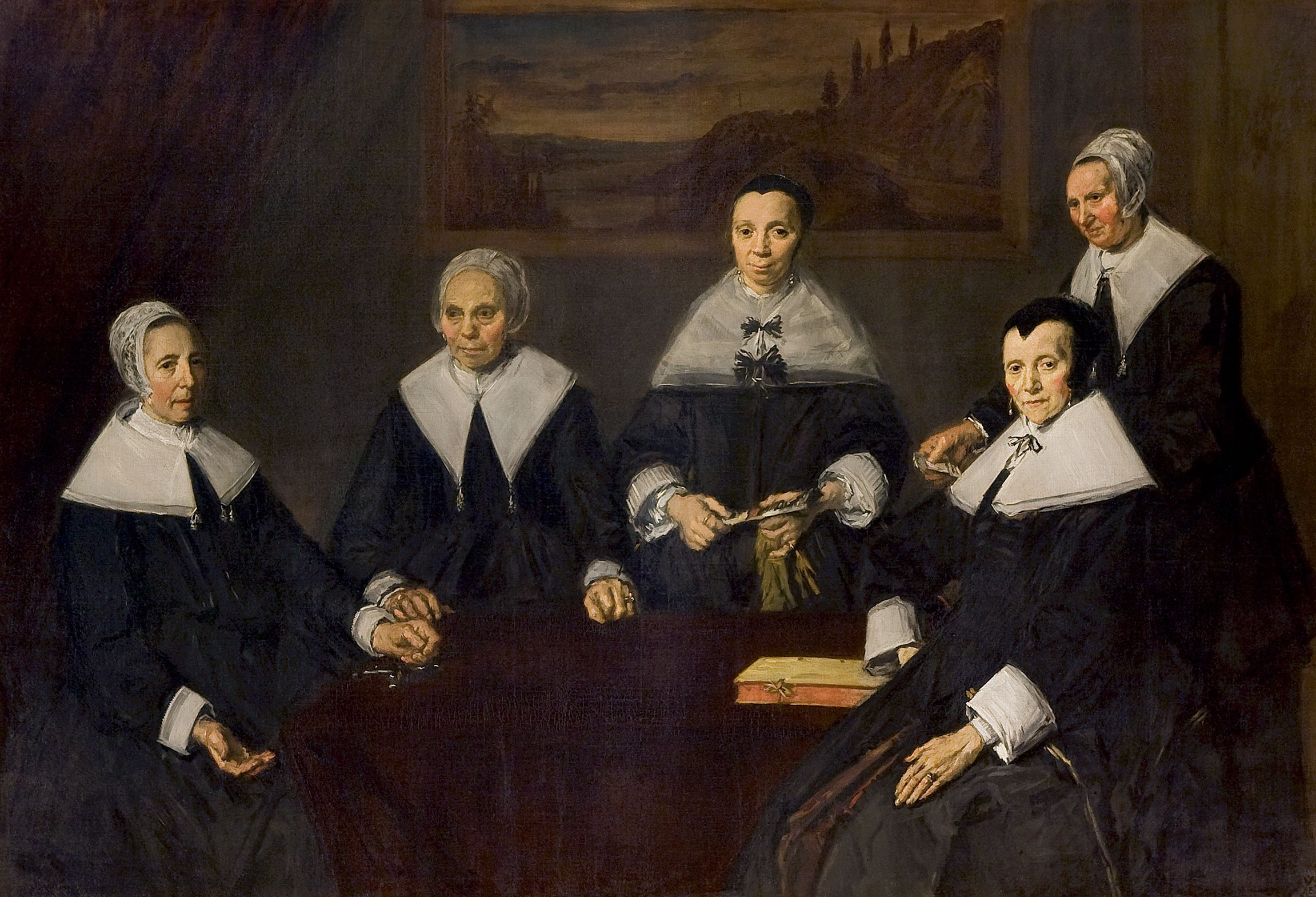
- Artist: Frans Hals
- Year: 1664
- Medium: Oil on canvas
- Movement: Dutch Golden Age painting
- Dimensions: 170.5 cm × 249.5 cm (67.1 in × 98.2 in)
- Location: Frans Hals Museum; Haarlem, Netherlands

The Regentesses of the Old Men's Almshouse Haarlem is a regents group portrait of four regentesses and (on the far right) the manager of the house painted by Frans Hals, c. 1664, for the Oude Mannenhuis in Haarlem, the Netherlands. It is a pendant to the Regents of the Old Men's Almshouse.

== Background ==
The regentesses portrayed were (left to right) Adriaentje Schouten, Marijtje Willemsdr (also recorded as regentess of Het Dolhuys), Anna van Damme (first married Abraham de Ridder, then in 1650 married Salomon Cousaert), Adriana Bredenhof (wife of the schout Mattheus Everswijn).

Frans Hals painted them in his "loose style", with rough brush strokes. The painting is traditionally dated 1664, though no archival evidence has yet been found to confirm this. The lack of any meticulous finishing, unusual in Hals' portraits of women, lead experts to assume this was painted towards the end of his life when he painted more loosely than in his younger years. The style of the women's dress also places the portrait well past the millstone collars of the 1640s and earlier. The painting currently hangs in the same location for which it was painted, namely the old men's almshouse in Haarlem known today as the Frans Hals Museum. According to Pieter Biesboer, the landscape painting on the rear wall is unidentified, but could possibly be an allegorical representation of the Good Samaritan, though no figures can be seen in it.

== 19th century copies ==
In the 19th century when Hals' loose brushwork became popular with impressionists, several copies were made of this painting:

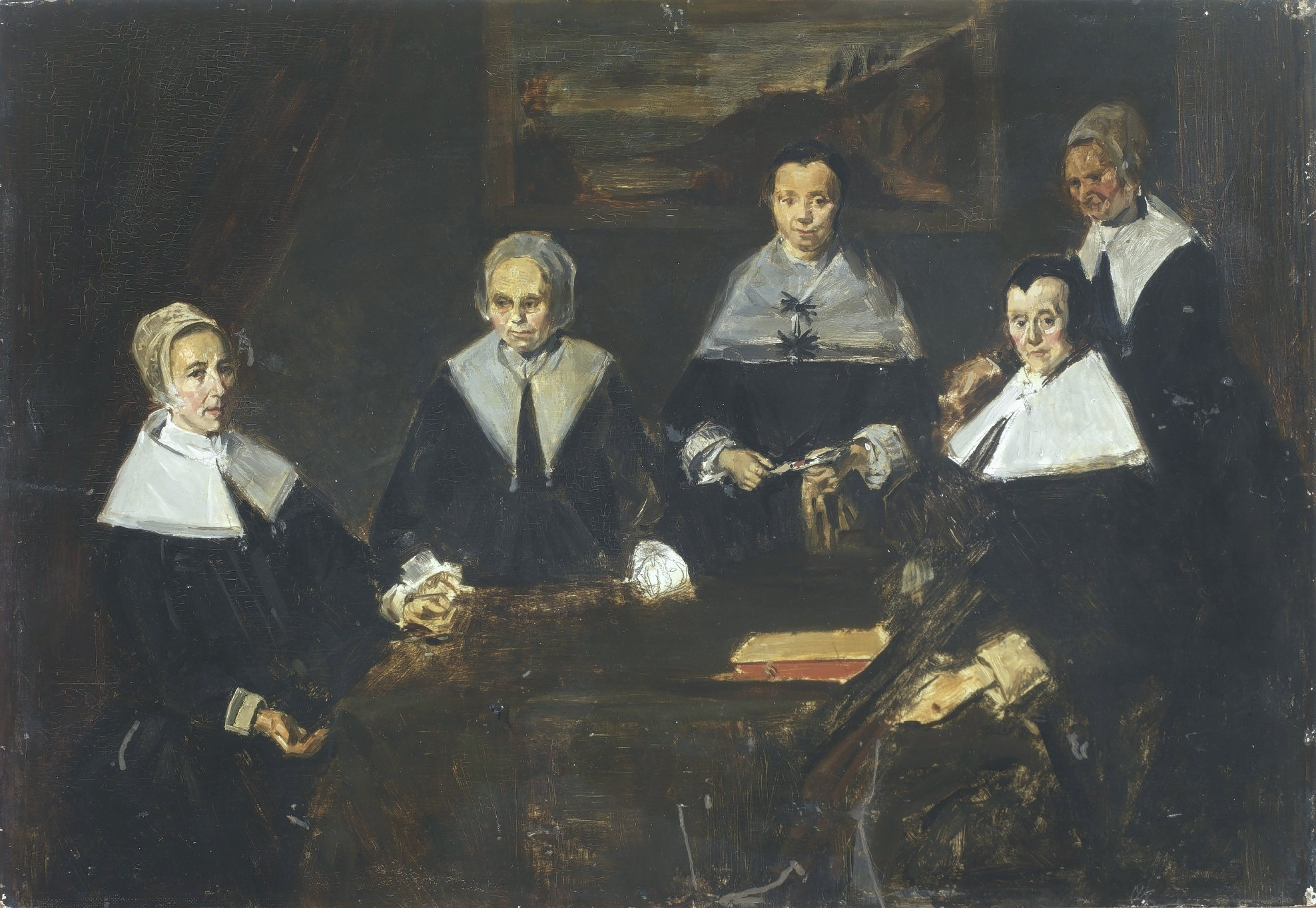
Édouard Manet made a copy upon his visit recorded on 26 June 1872

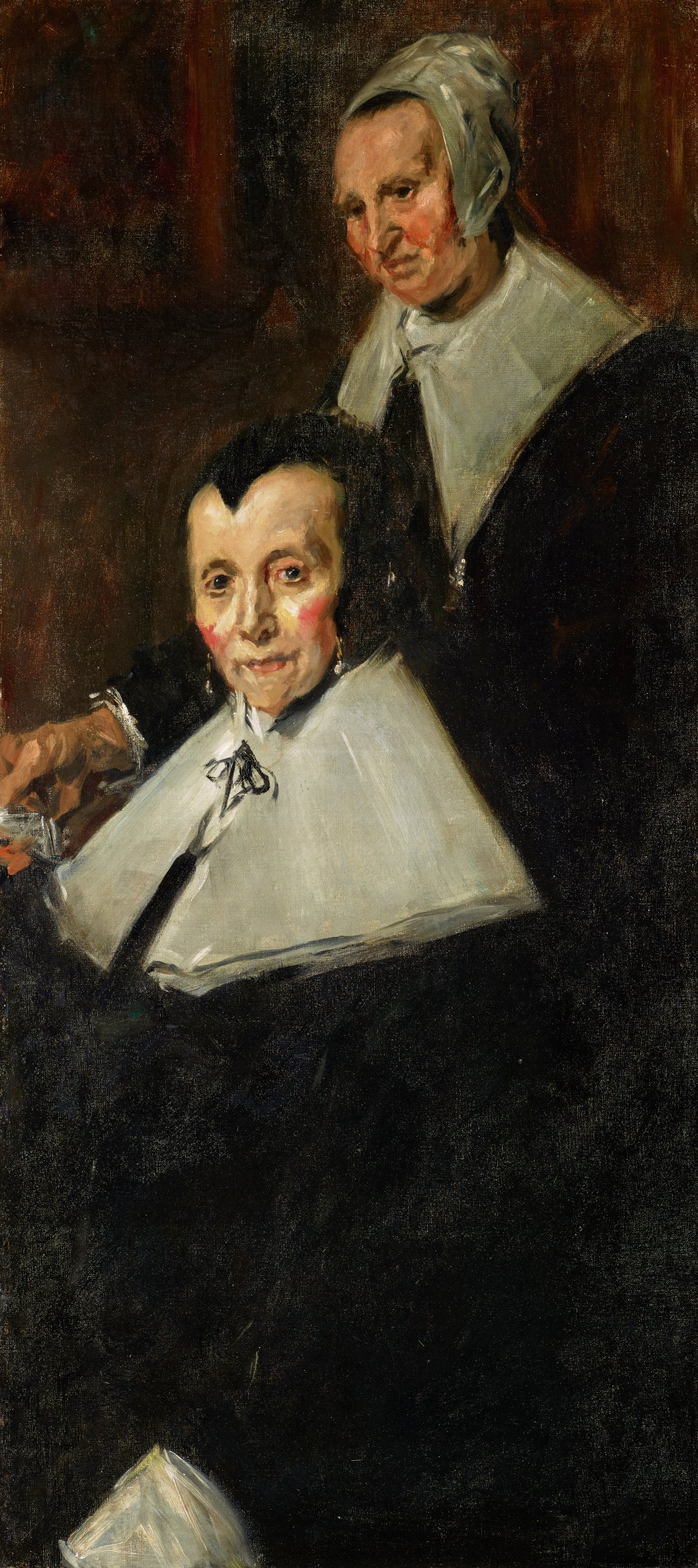
John Singer Sargent made a copy of the right portion

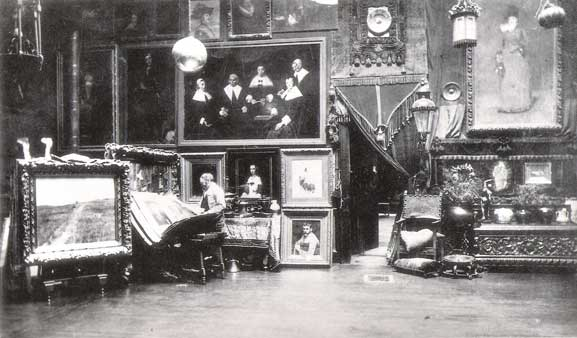
William Merritt Chase made a copy which he hung in his studio on Tenth Street, New York

Max Lieberman also made a copy of one of the heads. James Abbott McNeill Whistler visited in 1882, 1885, and in 1902 to study the Frans Hals paintings, and according to a witness of his last visit, was "completely charmed by the old women". The copy by Manet was discovered in 2018 and shown at the Frans Hals Museum during their 2018 exhibition Frans Hals and the Moderns. Like other copies after Hals' work, the copy gives insights into the state of the painting during Manet's time.

== See also ==
- List of paintings by Frans Hals
