= Amstelhof =

Coordinates: 52°21′54″N 4°54′9″E

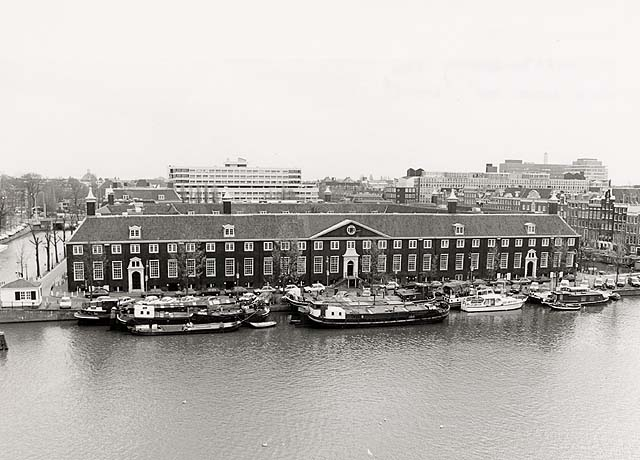
The Amstelhof

The Amstelhof (English: Amstel court), was a retirement home that is the H'ART Museum. It was built near the Amstel river in 1682 by the diaconate of the Dutch Reformed Church after having received an inheritance of the rich merchant Barent Helleman. He died on 18 October 1680 and left approximately 90,000 guilders to the church. The city of Amsterdam donated the land on which it was built.

== Design ==
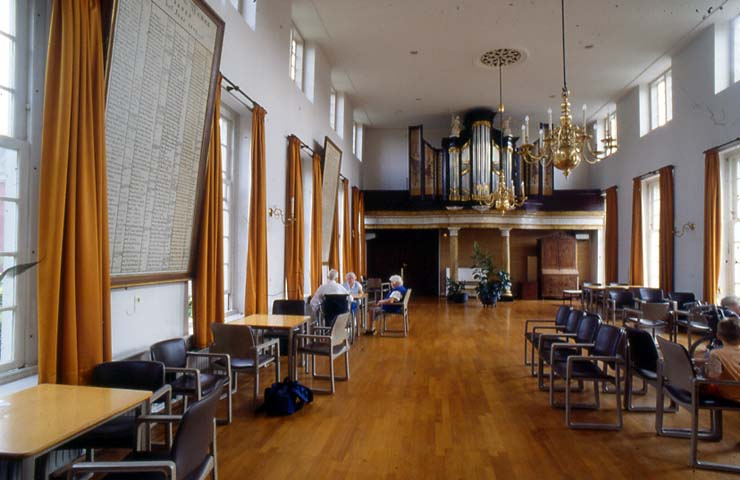
The church hall with the pipe organ

The building was designed by city architect Hans van Petersom. It has a classical style facade on the Amstel with a length 102 m, at the time the longest facade of Amsterdam. It has a symmetric map with a large courtyard. Around two secondary courtyard lie wings with rooms for the ladies: the chambrettes.

The centrally located monumental entrance leads to a fake door. The mayors at the time found an entrance with steps a necessity for a building of such stature. Directly behind the door is the church hall, which could not serve as entrance. Above the door the original name "Diaconate Old Women's Home anno 1681" (Dutch: Diaconie Oude Vrouwen Huys anno 1681) is written.

== Retirement home ==
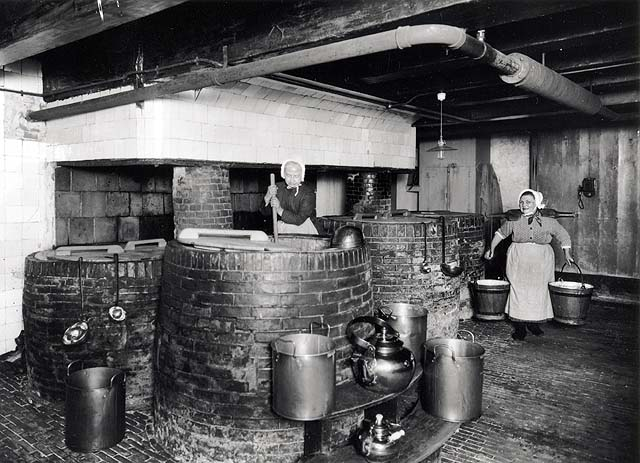
Two women working in the kitchen

At its opening in 1682 the home accommodated 400 ladies. Men were not allowed until 1817. In order to qualify, women had to be at least 50 years of age, a resident of Amsterdam for 15 years and member of the church for 10 years.

After more than three centuries as retirement home, the last inhabitants left in 2007 to two new properties in Diemen and Nieuw-Vennep. Despite various modifications over the years, it no longer met current standards.

== Hermitage ==
Between 2007 and 2009 the building was extensively remodelled to become a museum, the H'ART Museum. The museum was opened on 20 June 2009 by Dutch Queen Beatrix and Russian president Dmitry Medvedev.
