= Oude Mannenhuis =

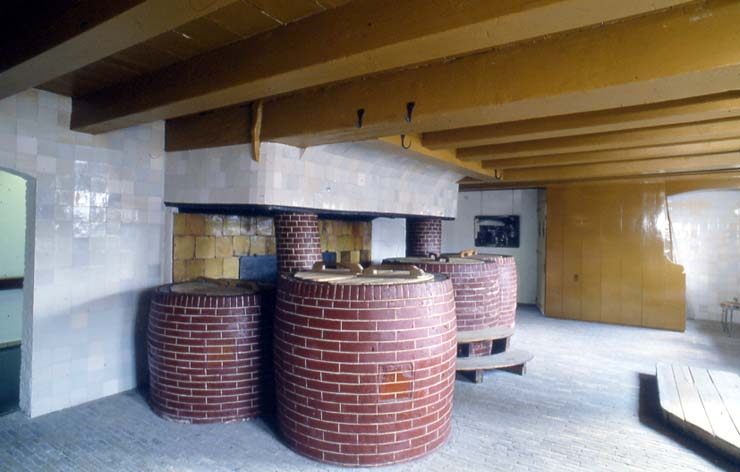
Former soup kitchen with cooking pots for the Oudemannenhuis in Amsterdam

An Oudemannenhuis, or Old Men's house is a Dutch term for a home for poor men older than sixty, who could spend their final days enjoying regular meals and a clean place to sleep. It can be regarded as an early type of retirement home, which lasted up to the 19th century. As an institution, they were an improvement over almshouses for the elderly poor known as hofjes. Because older men were generally less able to care for themselves than women, the city councils of the Netherlands built special purpose houses. After the introduction of Oudemannenhuizen, the hofjes were designed almost exclusively for women, because women could organize themselves more efficiently. For women who became too feeble to take part in hofje life, special "old houses" for woman were opened, that were often combined with old men's houses. Like the hofjes, living in an old man's house was usually free of charge and was considered a favor.

Similar to hofjes, the regents of old men's houses had a regent's room for meetings. The regents made and enforced the house rules, such as making church attendance mandatory and ladies visit or drunkenness prohibited. Breaking the rules was usually followed by house arrest. The old men lived in a room where they only had a bedstead, and occasionally they were assigned two to a room. A few old men's houses have been preserved, but they have been given a different purpose.

Older men with means could buy a room in a Proveniershuis, which was cheaper than a rental or hotel, but afforded more luxury than an Oudemannenhuis.
