= Woonbootmuseum =

House boat converted to a museum

Houseboat Museum Amsterdam
- Woonbootmuseum Amsterdam
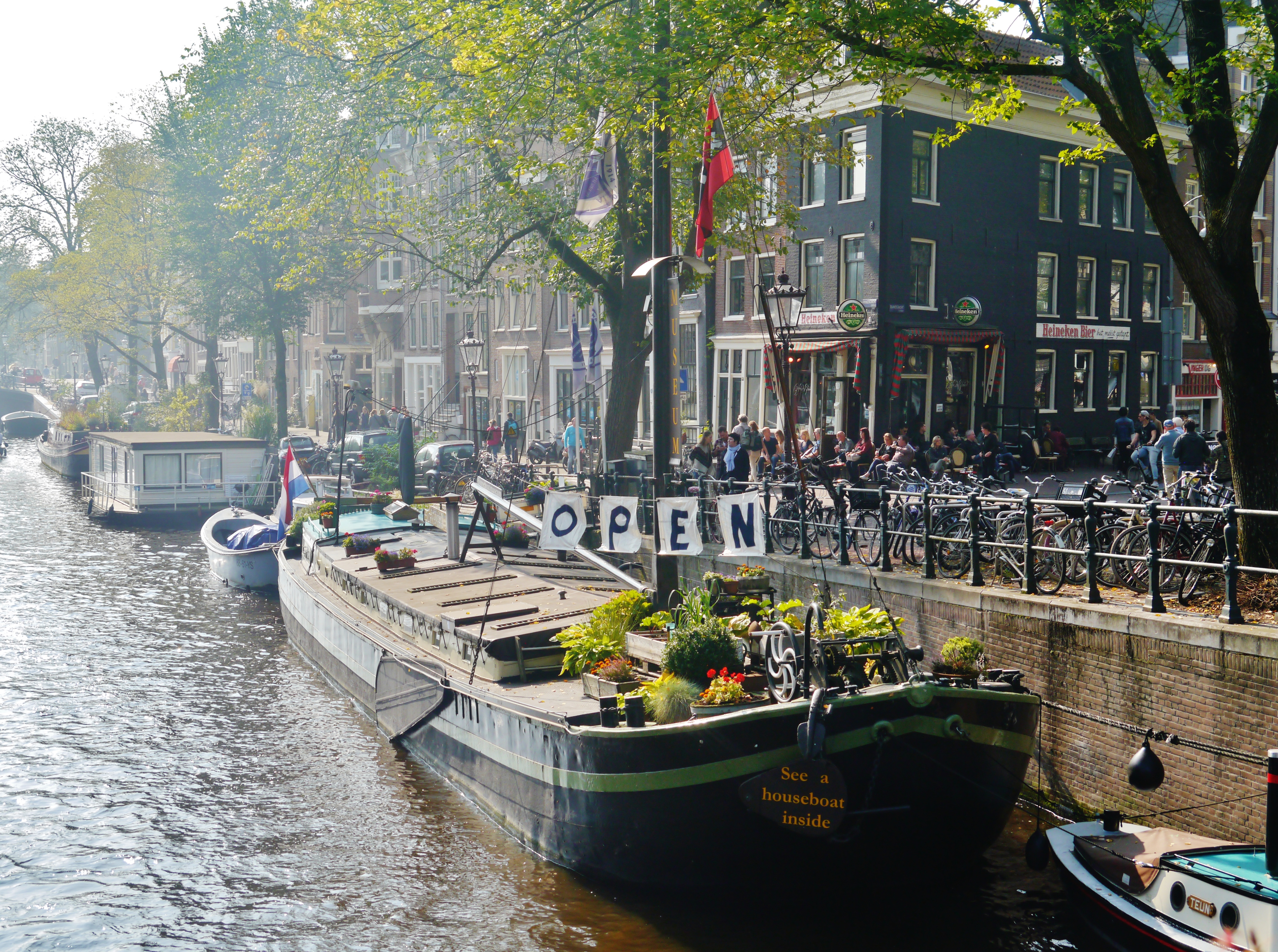
- Houseboat Museum Amsterdam

- Houseboat Museum Location in Amsterdam
- Established: 1997
- Location: Prinsengracht 296 K 1016 HW Amsterdam, Netherlands
- Coordinates: 52°22′13″N 4°52′57″E
- Public transit access: Westermarkt Tram Station, GVB, Amsterdam
- Website: https://houseboatmuseum.nl

The Woonbootmuseum (also known as the Houseboat Museum) is a museum in Amsterdam entirely dedicated to the history and culture of living on the water. The museum is located on the Prinsengracht, on the edge of the Jordaan, and is housed aboard the Hendrika Maria, a historic inland vessel from 1914. It is the only museum in the world specifically focused on this type of housing.

The museum is included in the Amsterdam City Card, but not in the Museumkaart.

== History ==
The Hendrika Maria was built in 1914 as a steel cargo ship (inland vessel). Until the 1960s, the ship was mainly used for transporting sand, gravel, wood, and coal. During World War II, the vessel was temporarily sunk.

In 1967, the ship was taken out of service due to economic obsolescence and converted into a residential houseboat. This fit within a broader historical trend in Amsterdam, where a post-war housing shortage led to old cargo ships being massively repurposed as permanent floating homes. The ship subsequently served as a regular private residence for thirty years.

The idea for the museum arose in the 1990s with then-houseboat resident Vincent van Loon. Because he noticed that passersby and tourists on the canals frequently peered curiously inside, he decided to establish a museum to provide insight into life on the water. In August 1996, he purchased the Hendrika Maria, after which the ship was fitted out as an exhibition space. The Woonbootmuseum officially opened its doors to the public in 1997.

In 2008, the ship was restored. During the renovations, the historic skipper's cabin (the authentic quarters of the skipper at the rear) was restored to its original condition. In 2024, the museum changed ownership. The new owners redecorated the residential section of the ship in a 1970s style to reflect the heyday of Amsterdam's houseboat culture.

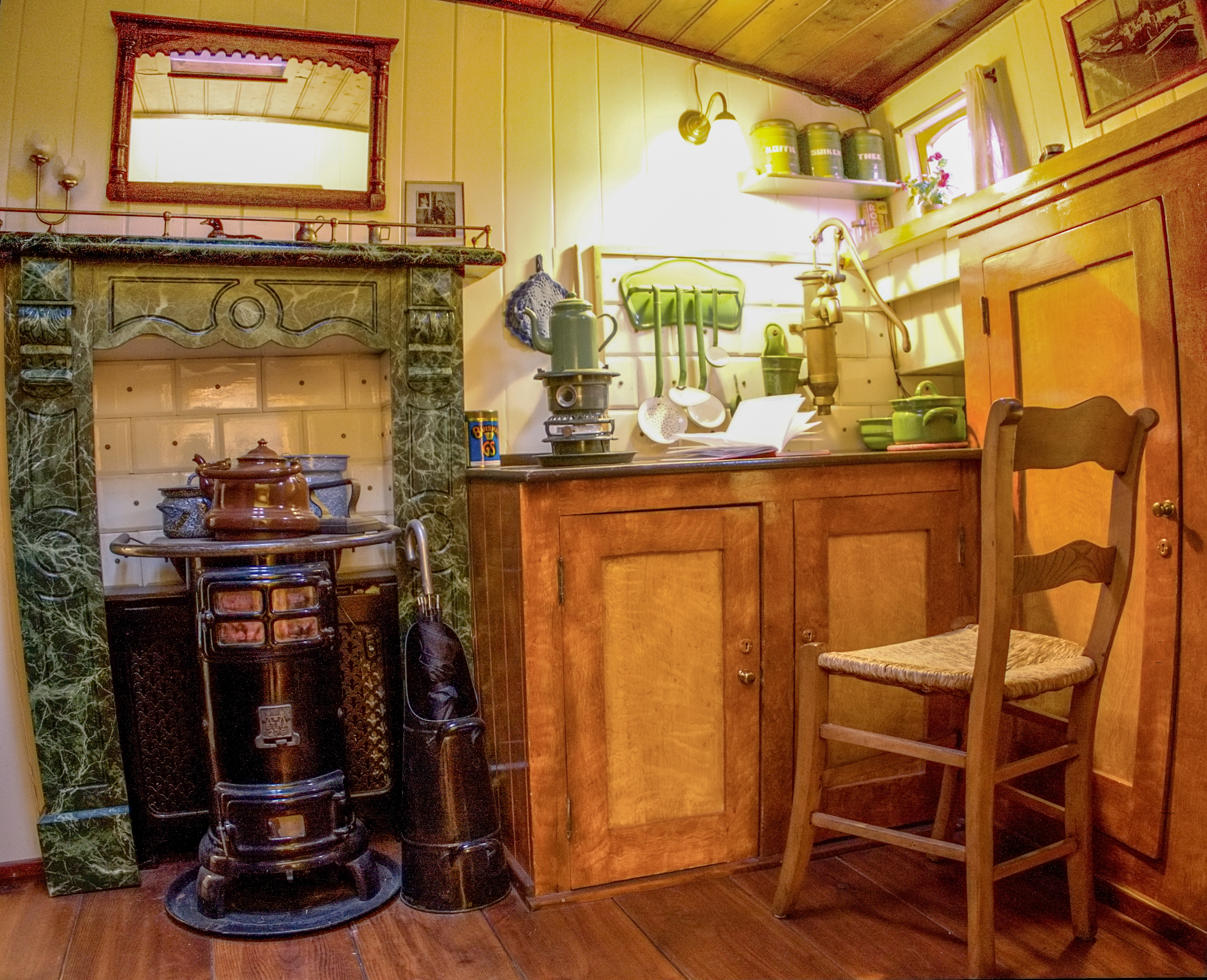
Kitchen in Houseboat Museum

== Collection and exhibition ==
The exhibition space is located in the former cargo hold of the ship and has a total surface area of approximately 80 square meters. Visitors get an impression of the layout of a typical Amsterdam houseboat, equipped with a functional kitchen, a seating area, sanitary facilities, and a box bed.

The museum's permanent exhibition highlights the ship's transition from cargo vessel to houseboat. In addition, the museum presents information on the broader history of Amsterdam's canals and the laws and regulations concerning moorings and utilities in the city. The presentation is supported by historical photographs, a short visual presentation in the bow of the ship, and a multilingual audio tour.
