= Houseboat =

Boat used as a home

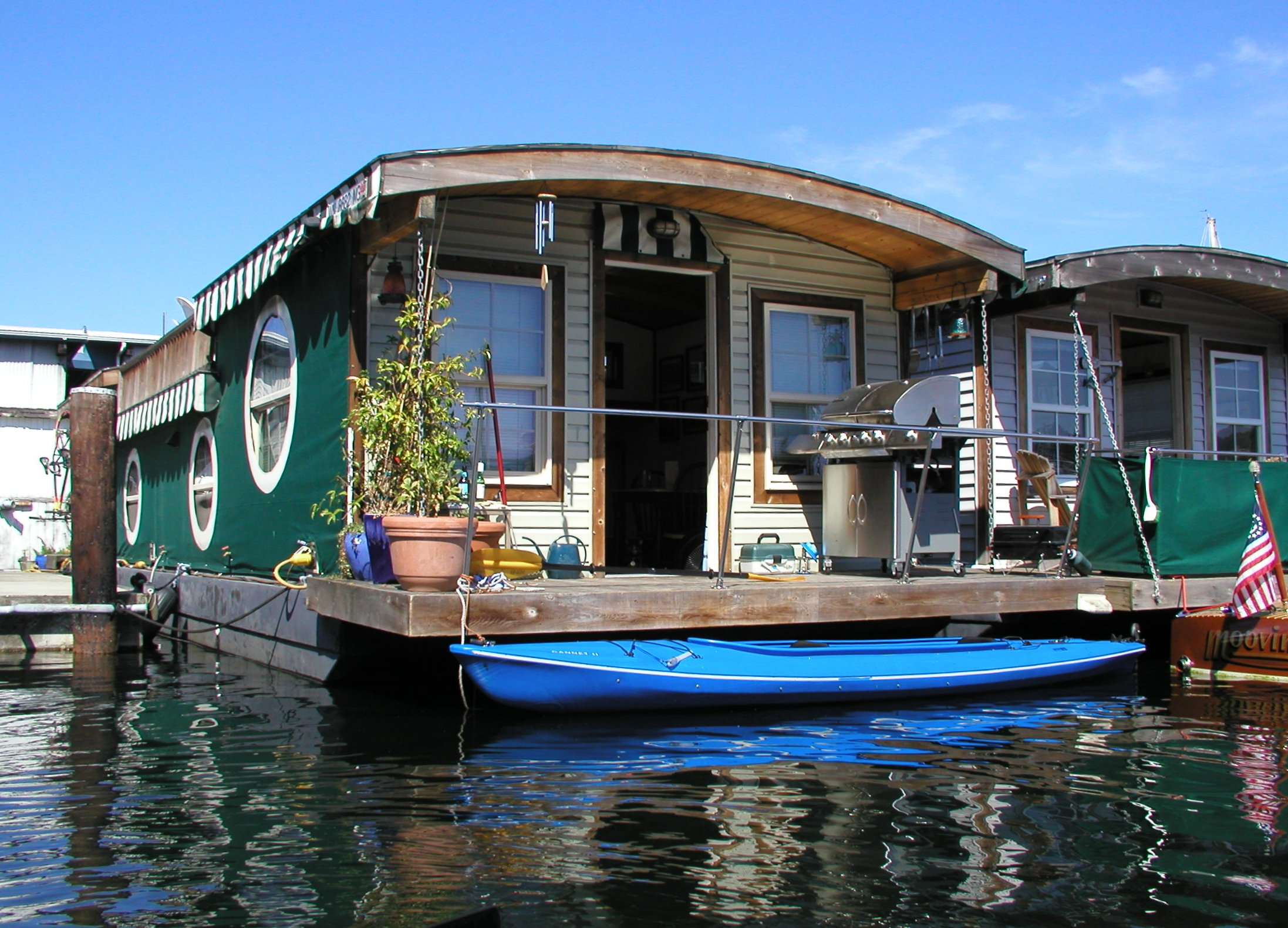
A houseboat on Lake Union in Seattle, Washington, US

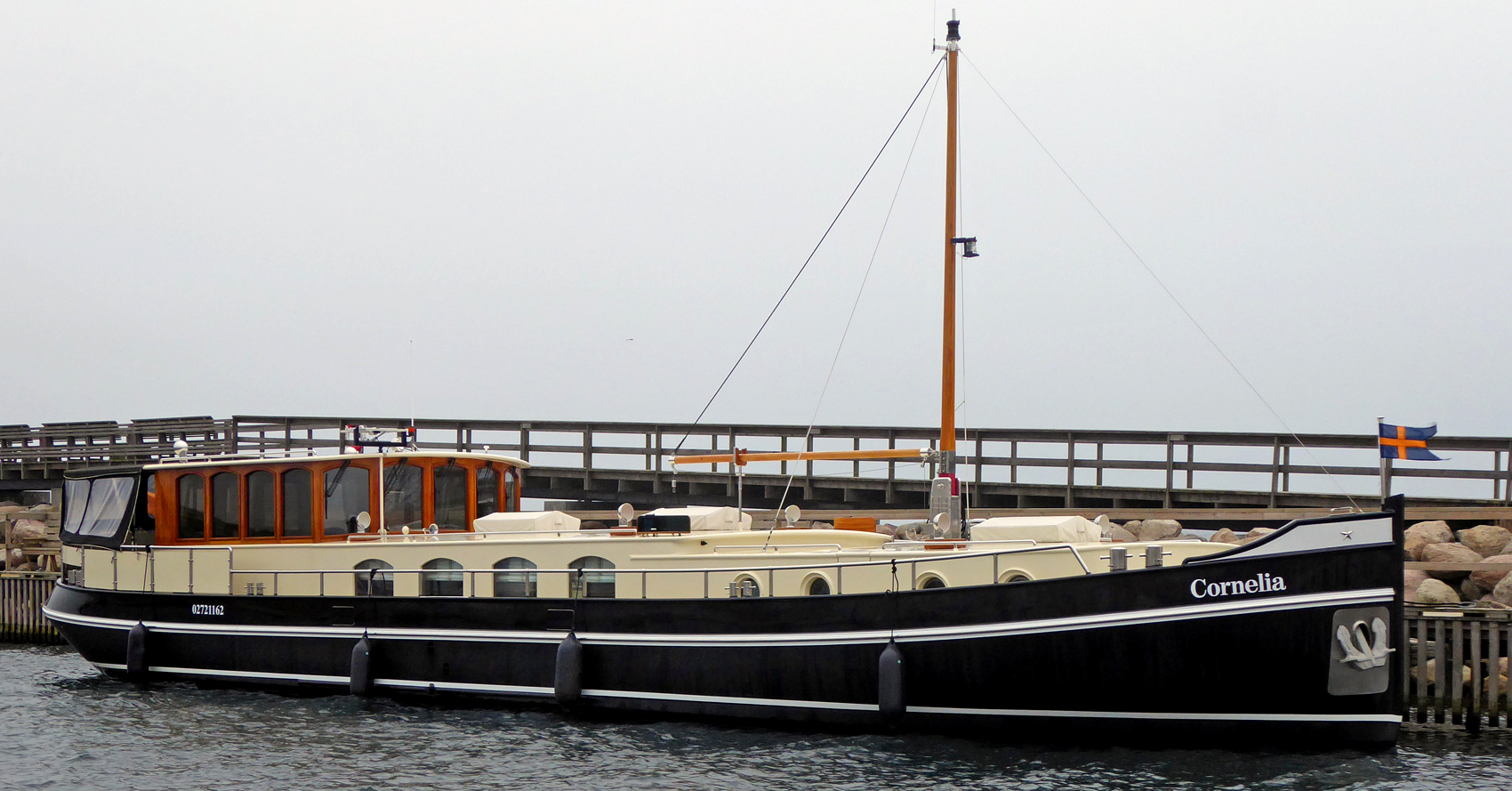
Houseboat Cornelia in Ystad, Sweden, 2018

A houseboat is a boat that has been designed or modified to be used primarily for regular dwelling. Most houseboats are not motorized, as they are usually moored or kept stationary, fixed at a berth, and often tethered to land to provide utilities. However, many are capable of operation under their own power.

Houseboats are largely found on small inland rivers, lakes, and streams, and in coastal harbours, especially where there is good fishing, in many countries.

== Africa ==
=== South Africa ===
Houseboats in South Africa include self-drive houseboats on the Knysna Lagoon and fully catered houseboats on Lake Jozini. There have been a number of serious incidents with houseboat fires in the country. On 19 November 2016, four people died on Hartbeespoort Dam after a fire broke on a houseboat party. On 9 October 2021, a faulty engine set luxury houseboat Shayamanzi afire and led to the death of two crew members and a German tourist.

=== Zambia ===
In Zambia, specifically on Lake Kariba, houseboats have been around and in use since the use of the lake in the late 1950s to early 1960s.

== Asia ==
=== Bangladesh ===
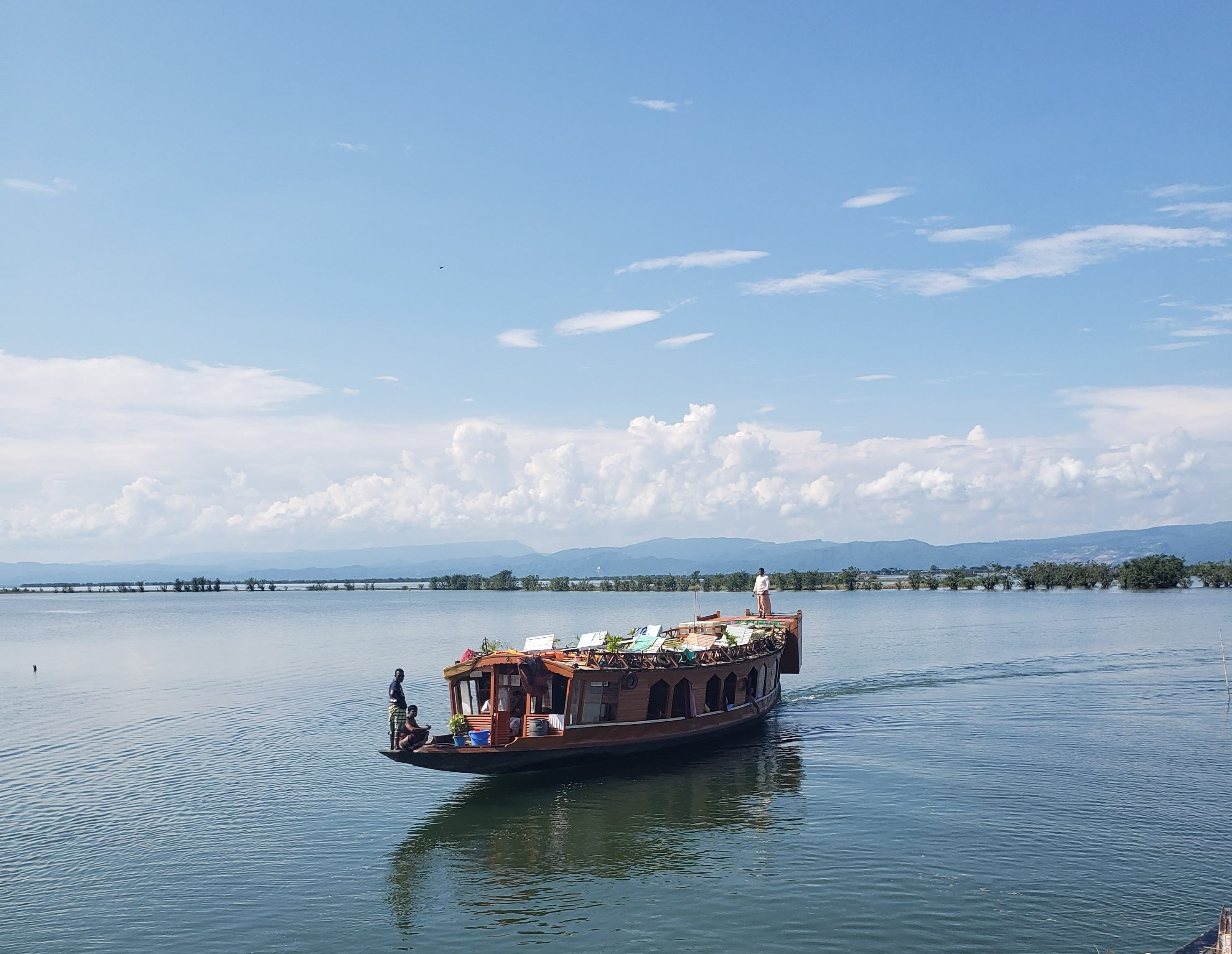
A tourist houseboat in Tanguar Haor, Bangladesh

Houseboats have become more popular as a tourist attraction due to the number of houseboats plying at Tanguar Haor. There is a large, slow-moving houseboat used for leisure trips. This service is inspired by the houseboat used by India's famed author Rabindranath Tagore during his visit to Shilaidaha. It is about 71 feet (22 m) long and about 14 feet (4.3 m) wide at the middle, and has been in service since 2021.

=== Hong Kong ===
There is a houseboat and fishing community on the southern side of Hong Kong Island, known as Aberdeen Floating Village. There was also one such community in the Yau Ma Tei Typhoon Shelter.

=== India ===
In India, houseboats used as accommodation for tourists are common on the backwaters of Kerala and also on Dal Lake near Srinagar in Jammu and Kashmir (see below).

==== Kerala houseboats ====
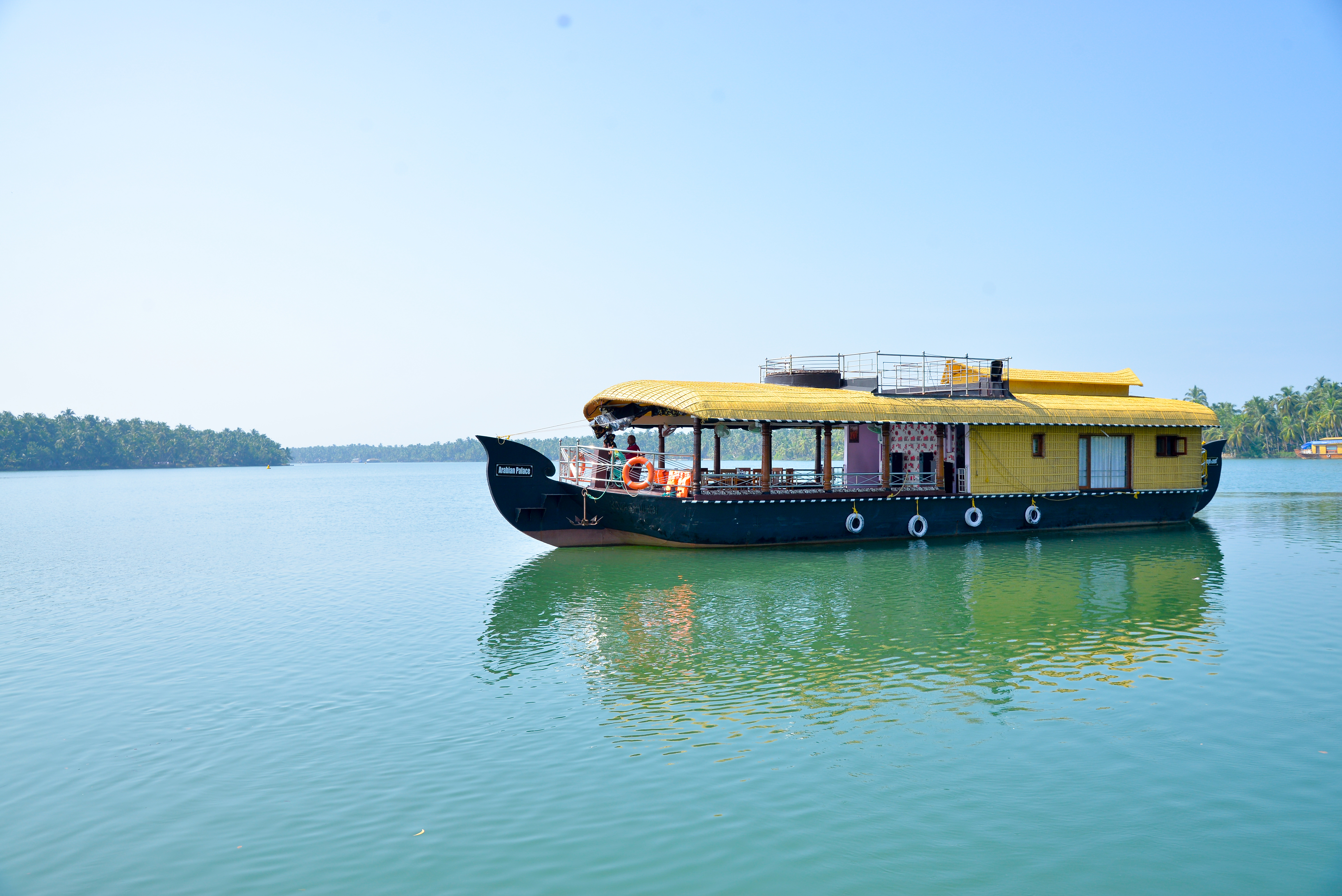
A Kettuvallam at Kavvayi Backwaters, Nileshwaram, Kasaragod, India

Houseboats in Kerala, south India, are huge, slow-moving barges used for leisure trips. They are a reworked model of Kettuvallams (in the Malayalam language, Kettu means "tied with ropes", and vallam means "boat"), which, in earlier times, were used to carry rice and spices from Kuttanad to the Kochi port. Kerala houseboats were considered a convenient means of transportation. First Modern House Boat In Kerala developed by Thomas Vargheese in Kottayam in the time of Dr. Babu Paul IAS. The popularity of Kettuvallams has returned as major tourist attractions.

These houseboats are about 60 to 70 feet (18 to 21 m) long and about 15 feet (4.6 m) wide at the middle. Kerala houseboats are characterized by their thatched roofs made of bamboo and palm leaves, supported by a sturdy wooden hull. The construction involves traditional techniques, where the planks are tied together using coir ropes without a single nail, ensuring flexibility and strength. The boat exterior is painted with protective coats of cashew nut oil.

==== Kashmir houseboats ====
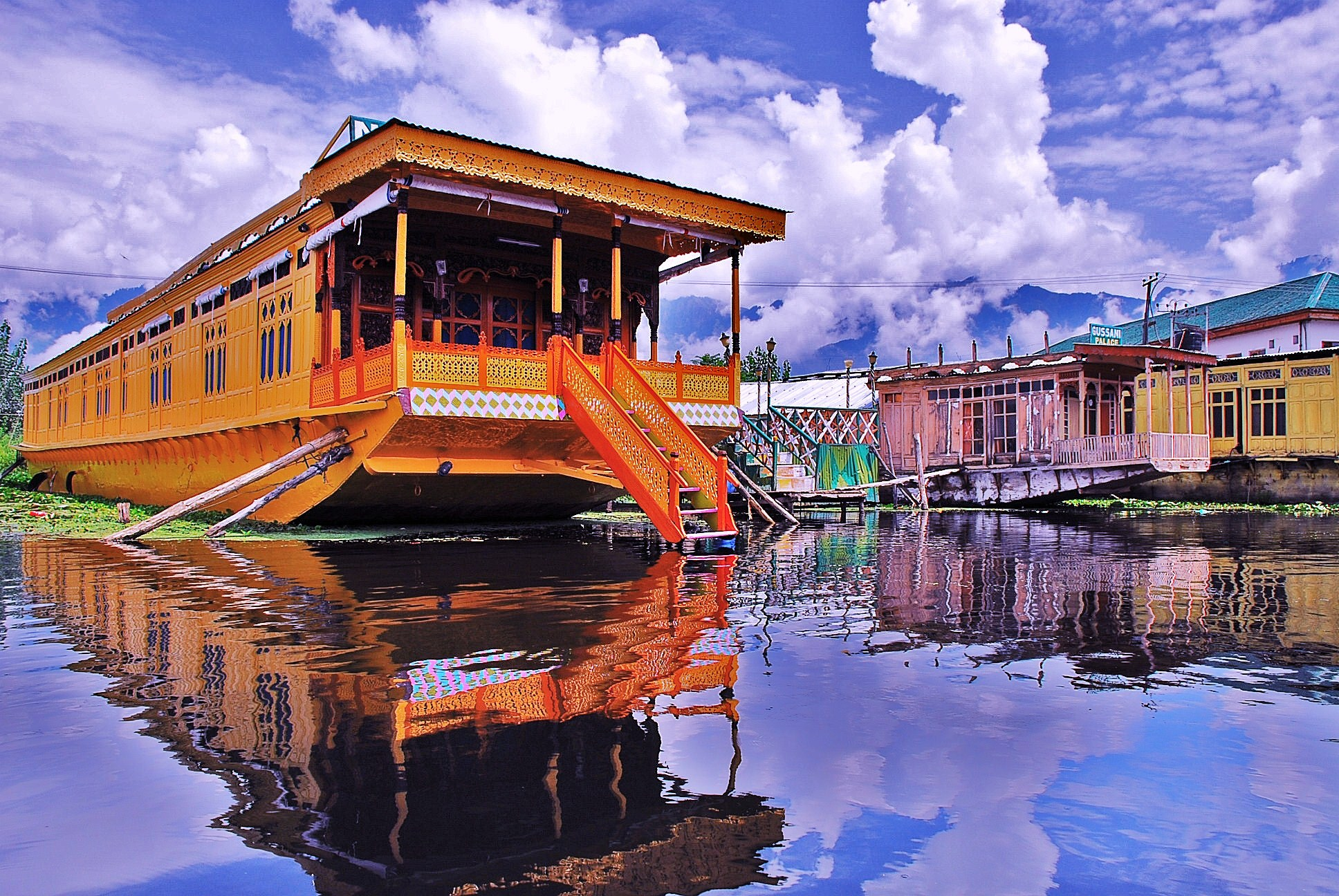
Houseboat on Dal Lake in Srinagar, Kashmir

Unlike their counterparts in Kerala, the houseboats in Srinagar in Jammu and Kashmir — the northernmost state of India — are usually stationary, generally moored at the edges of Dal Lake and Nageen Lake. Some houseboats there were built in the early 1900s and are currently rented out to tourists. These houseboats are made of wood and usually have intricately carved wood paneling. They are of different sizes, some having up to three bedrooms apart from a living room and kitchen.

=== Indonesia ===
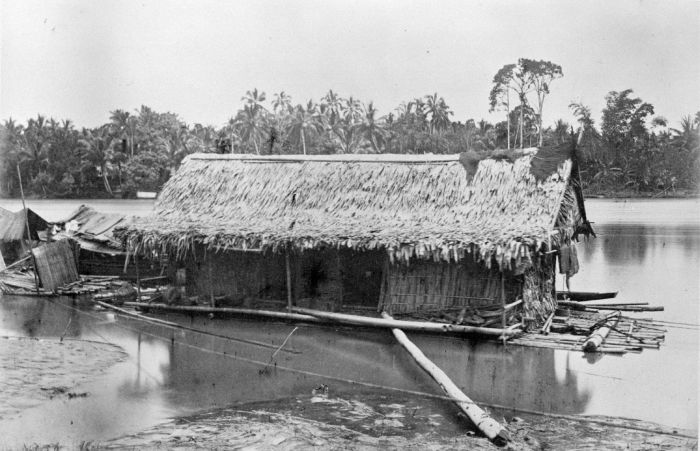
Rumah rakit (raft house) in Surulangun, Rawas Ulu, North Musi Rawas circa 1877–1879

In Indonesia, a floating house is called as rumah apung. A rumah rakit (Indonesian: raft house) is a type of traditional house found in riverine realm of South Sumatra, which is thought to have existed since the time of the Srivijaya kingdom. Raft houses are built on rafts and float along the banks of the Musi River, Ogan River and Komering River. To avoid the raft drifting away, the raft house is tied to a serdang (tether).

=== Laos ===
In Laos, houseboats are used to accommodate tourists on the Mekong River. Usually referred to as "slow boats", the houseboats exist in wooden or steel variants.

== Europe ==
=== Germany ===
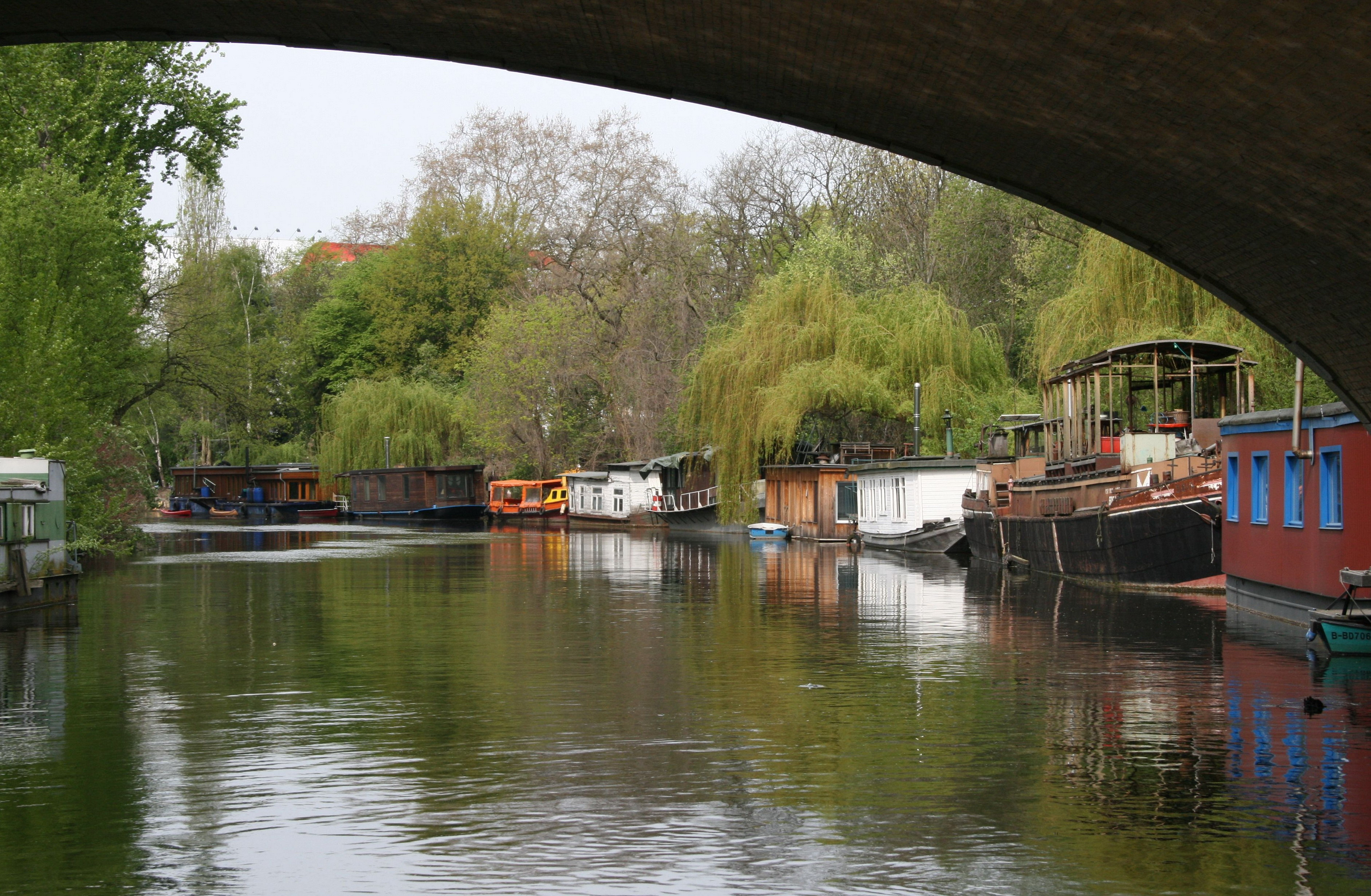
Houseboats on Landwehrkanal, Berlin, Germany

The Port of Hamburg has a sizable water-borne community that includes a Flussschifferkirche, or Boatman's Church. Berlin also has some houseboat neighborhoods, notably on the Landwehrkanal in Friedrichshain-Kreuzberg.

=== Netherlands ===
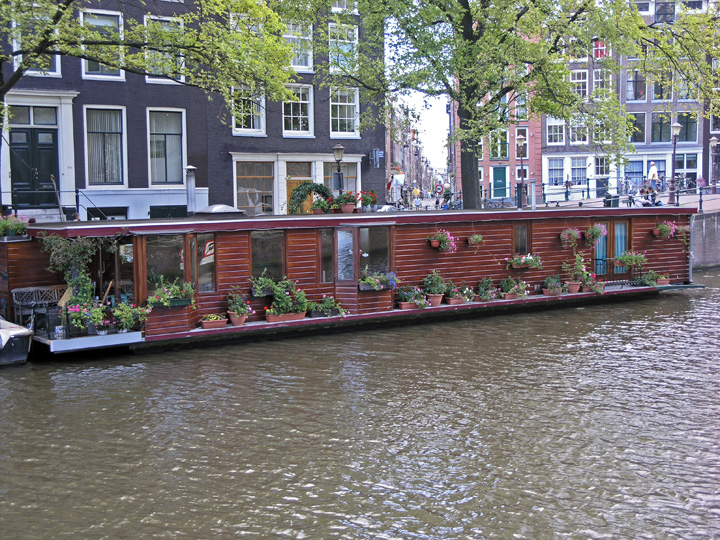
Houseboat in Amsterdam, Netherlands

Houseboats can be seen along the canals of Amsterdam, and some include hotels. Houseboats are considered expensive in Amsterdam because of the limited number of moorings. Approximately 2,400 families live on the inner waters of Amsterdam. The bloemenmarkt is a houseboat-borne flower market along the Singel in Amsterdam. The town of Maasbommel is pioneering floating houses, with flexible connections for fluids and electricity, intended not primarily for travel, but rather safety against flooding.

Amsterdam has a houseboat museum, located on a renovated cargo ship built in 1914.

=== Poland ===
Poland is the world's second largest producer of motor yachts, up to 9 meters in length after the United States. Poland has extensive experience in the production of modern and stylish houseboat yachts and floating houses. There is houseboat recreation in the Masuria District and on the Vistula River and lakes close to the Baltic seaside.

According to Zegluj.pl, the largest houseboat rental service in Poland, there are about 100 new units for charter every year.

=== Serbia ===
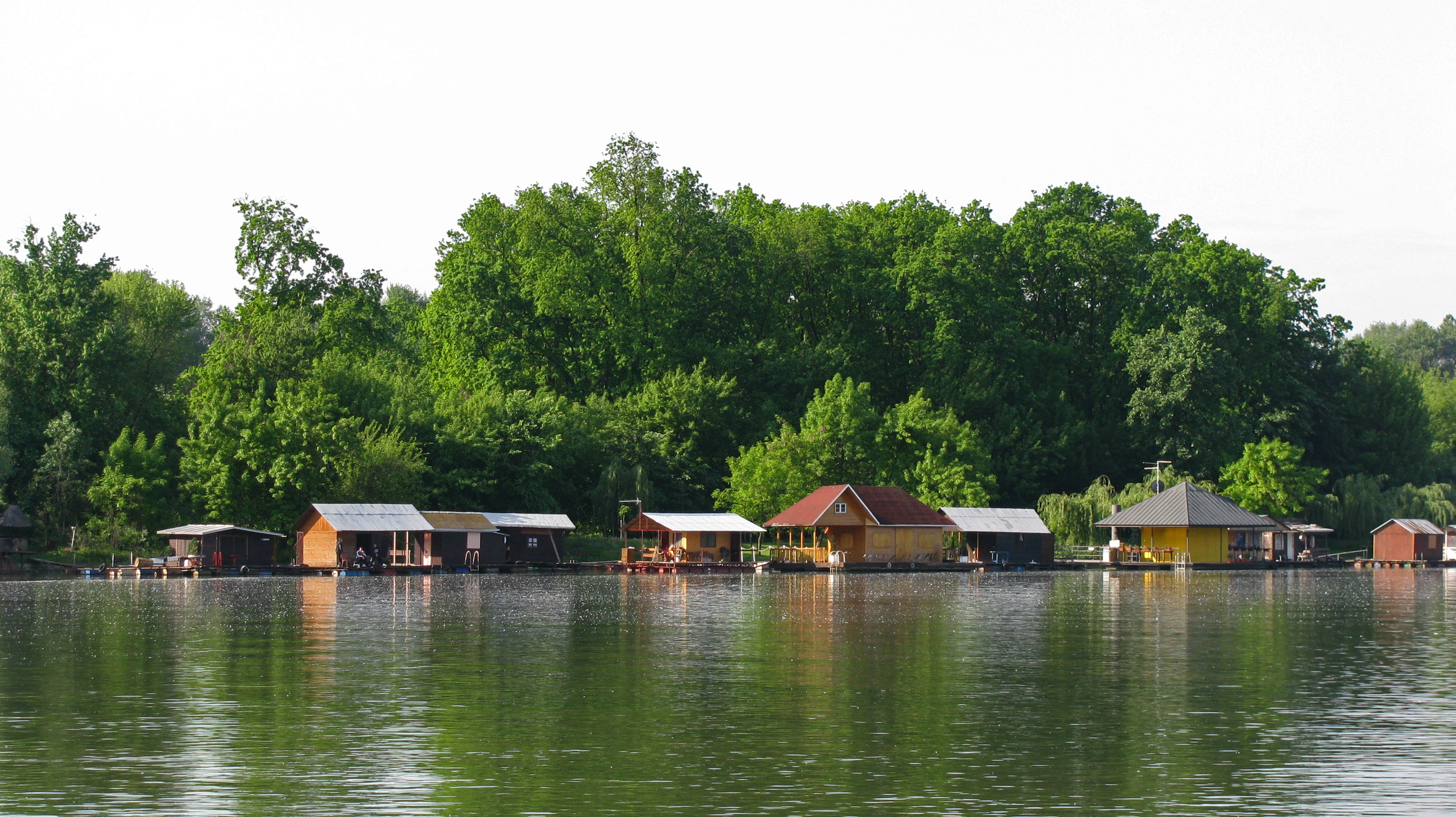
Houseboats on Ada Ciganlija, Belgrade, Serbia

Houseboats are popular for recreation, dining and clubbing in Serbia. They can be seen in large numbers in Belgrade on the banks of the Danube and Sava Rivers, and on river islands.

=== United Kingdom ===
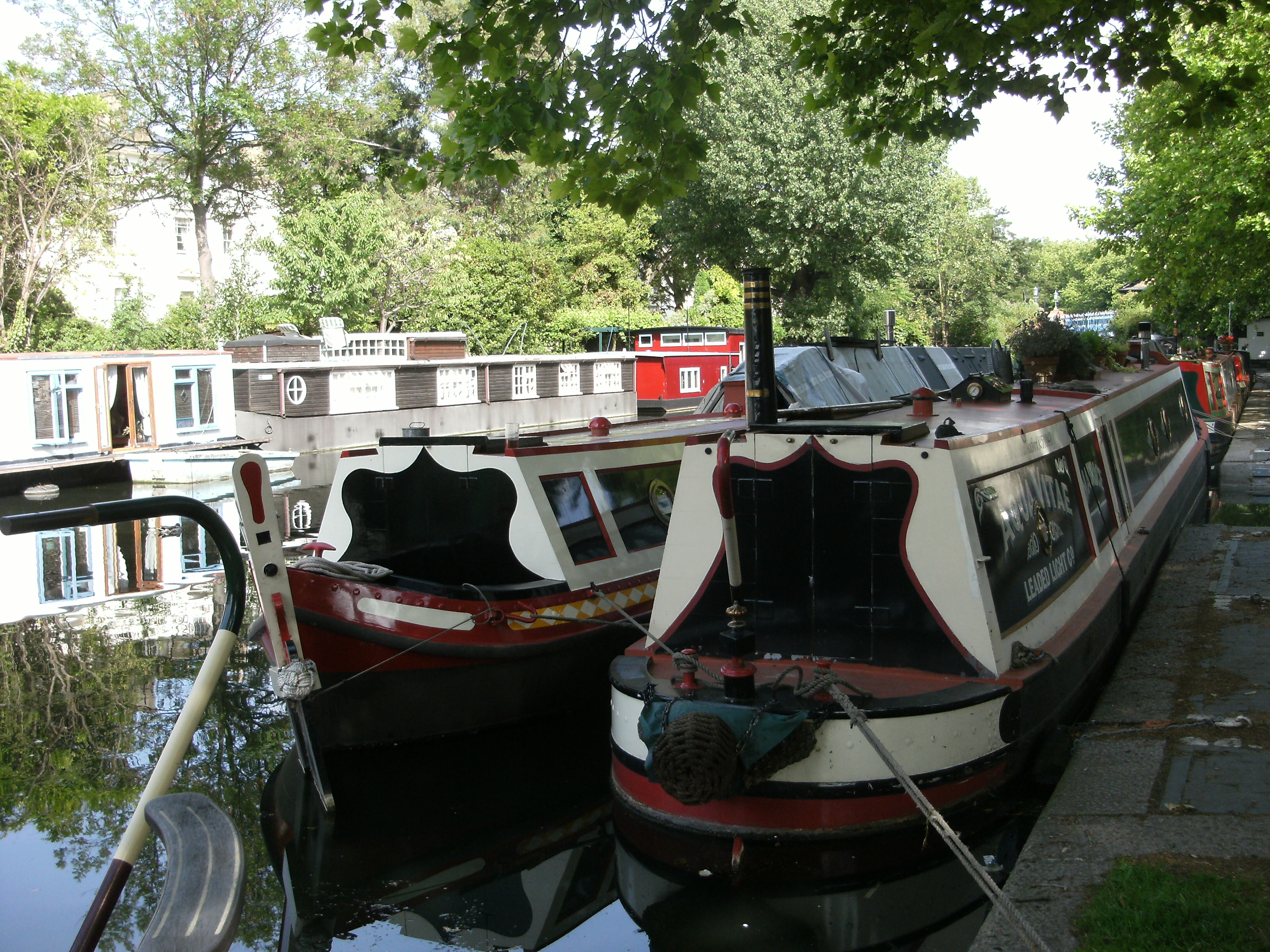
Temporarily moored narrowboats (near bank) and permanently moored houseboats (far bank) on the Paddington Arm of the Grand Union Canal in Little Venice, London, England

In the United Kingdom, houseboats come under various authorities depending on where they are moored. Those that usually do not move from year to year and are in marinas come under local authorities. Those moored on tidal waters (estuaries and coastal harbours) come under various authorities. Most navigable inland waterways in England and Wales come under the authority of either the waterways managed by Environment Agency (EA, sponsored by the Department for Environment, Food and Rural Affairs) or the waterways managed by the Canal and River Trust (CRT). Scotland, Northern Ireland and some additional waterways in England and Wales have their own authorities (see the List of navigation authorities in the United Kingdom).

Both the EA and the CRT distinguish between powered vessels (including sail) and unpowered houseboats. The EA defines Launches as "any mechanically propelled vessel not being used solely as a tug or for the carriage of goods", and houseboats that "includes any pleasure boat which is not a launch and which is decked or otherwise structurally covered in and which is or is capable of being used as a place of habitation". The CRT, which manages 2,000 miles of inland waterways, requires any houseboat moored on their waterways to have a houseboat certificate. The CRT defines a houseboat as "'a boat whose main use is for a purpose other than navigation and which, if needed for the purpose, has planning permission, for the site where it is moored'. A houseboat may be used for navigation from time to time provided it does not become its main use".

The CRT definition provides a large grey area about what a houseboat is, because owners of a narrowboat, or other inhabitable vessels (see list of the types of canal craft in the United Kingdom) who live on board may choose to define their boat either as a cruising vessel and pay for a cruising licence, or obtain a houseboat certificate. The decision often depends on which is cheapest and whether the CRT, or the local authority overseeing a marina's planning permission, allows moorings to be residential (meeting the local authority's requirements allowing permanent residence aboard at the mooring), or leisure (inhabitability only for short periods).

== North America ==
=== Canada ===
Toronto's Bluffer's Park is home to a small float home community with 24 properties within the park's marina. A city bylaw states that no more than 25 floating homes can be built. The homes in Toronto are built on concrete barges chained to the lake bottom and docked at the marina to allow residence year round. These homes have no motor and thus are not vessels.

Ladner's Canoe Pass Village is a small float home community along the Fraser River near Westham Island, located along River Road in West Ladner, in the Port Guichon neighborhood. It was opened in 1985 as Canada's first legalized floating home community.

=== United States ===
==== Houseboat communities ====
The US has many houseboat communities. Portland, Oregon, is the largest. Many houseboats are moored along both the Willamette River and the Columbia River, with the neighborhood of Hayden Island a prominent example. Float houses are mostly used on the Pacific coast.

Seattle, Washington, is home to a relatively large collection of houseboats (capable of moving under their own power) or "floating homes" (houses built on floats) in several neighborhoods, particularly in Lake Union and Portage Bay. These began to appear soon after the time of first European settlement. At their peak in the first half of the 20th century, there were over 2,500 such homes in the city, not even counting seaworthy liveaboard boats. From the outset, they included floating slums of shabby shacks, but gentrified houseboats go back at least to 1888 when the Yesler Way cable car reached Leschi on Lake Washington and a string of luxury summer getaways (none surviving today) lined the shore from there north to Madison Park. As of 2010, there were about 480 floating homes on Lake Union and a lesser number elsewhere in the city.

Sausalito, California, has one of the most noted collections of float homes owned at various times by famous musicians, film stars, authors, and other notables, from the hippie era until even today. Nearby Belvedere's houseboats date to the late 1800s, and houseboats in the area were homes to railway men shipping logs to San Francisco via the ferry at Sausalito. Like many areas where float homes have taken hold, battles have brewed between float home owners, local and state government, and the local establishment — which includes land-based home owners. Float home owners had fought established land-based tax schemes whereby float home owners sought relief from real estate taxes. The state won the battle with the shadow tax allowing the state to make the case that property beneath the float home was improved by the shadow the float home cast upon the bottom.

On the other side of the country, the nation's capital of Washington, DC, has a major houseboat community: the Wharf Marina (expanded to 400 boat slips from the former Gangplank Marina, a name by which it is still referred to by many locals) on the Potomac River. It is a popular destination for summer holidays in Washington.

New York City also has a number of houseboat communities. As of 1999, the city was estimated to have several hundred houseboats scattered across its five boroughs.

==== Houseboating options ====
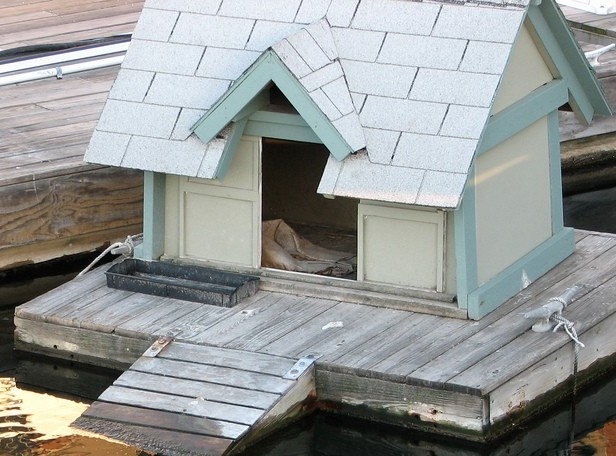
A doghouseboat on the Charles River in Cambridge, Massachusetts, US

Rental of houseboats has become popular. In addition, houseboats have been used in commerce. For example, in the Northern Neck of Virginia, Chesapeake National Bank had a floating bank branch called the Boat 'n Bank that provided bank services to watermen. Halibut Cove, Alaska has one of the only floating post offices in the US. Mystic Island, New Jersey, had a "botel" (hotel for boaters with water access) when it started in the 1960s but the building has since changed ownership and no longer operates as such.

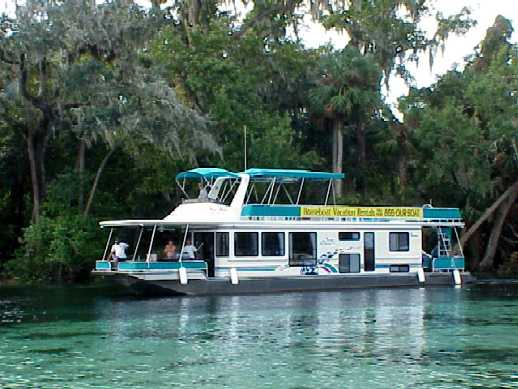
A houseboat in Silver Glen Springs, just off Lake George, Florida, US

Houseboating is a very popular recreational activity for groups of people of all ages, aboard houseboats of all varieties ranging from more modest 30-to-40-foot boats to 70-foot (21 m)-plus luxury houseboat models. Alternatives to traditional houseboats include flybridge cruisers and catamarans also providing overnight accommodation up to a week.

Houseboating's appeal is due to the ability it provides to more completely explore the local scenery; remain in close proximity to other outdoor activities (hiking, boating, beaches, etc.); and retain the potential to move the living quarters on a whim for a change of view or neighbors.

Recreational houseboating in the United States started in the late 1940s when people were looking to stay on the water for longer periods of time. Lake Cumberland in Kentucky is considered the birthplace of houseboating in the US. Most of America's manufactured houseboats are in the counties surrounding Lake Cumberland. Kentucky has more lake-style houseboats than any other place in the world, and the state is known as the "Houseboat Capital of the World", although one of its towns, Monticello, has also been labeled with that honor more directly.

Houseboating on Lake Powell in Utah and Arizona is a popular vacation option, since Arizona's Glen Canyon Dam impounds water from the Colorado River to form almost 2,000 miles (3,200 km) of shoreline. Popular spots for houseboats on other lakes include Lake Mead, the largest man-made lake in North America, about 30 minutes from Las Vegas; and two California lakes, New Bullards Bar Reservoir in the Sierra Nevada foothills about 45 minutes from Nevada City and Lake Shasta in the mountains just outside Redding. Four rivers or "arms" merge to create this: the Sacramento, McCloud, Sulanharas Creek, and Pit. Shasta Dam, the highest center spillway dam in the world, can be found at the southwest corner of the lake. Lake Shasta Caverns, can be reached only from the lake.

Houseboating is also common on Lake Cumberland, which is often referred to as the Houseboat Manufacturing Capital of the World because the majority of American-built houseboats are manufactured in the counties surrounding the lake. Lake Cumberland and other lakes in the southeastern US such as Norris Lake (Tennessee), Dale Hollow Lake (Kentucky/Tennessee), Center Hill Lake (Tennessee), and Lake Lanier (Georgia), to mention a few in that area, offer very favorable houseboating conditions as the geography provides a vast number of coves and fingers that allow houseboats to tie up or anchor away from the main channel and provides the user a peaceful, secluded atmosphere. Due to the large number of houseboat manufacturers located in the Southeast US, the new and used houseboat marketplace there is one of the most competitive and affordable areas for houseboats to be purchased in the nation. Houseboat transporters can also deliver a houseboat to any body of water in the US. Houseboating is also popular on Lake Amistad, Trinity Lake, Lake Mohave and Lake Mead National Recreation Area. In New York, houseboats have also become a major part of the great South Bay on Long Island. Houseboats are also available for rental at Lake Billy Chinook in Central Oregon, where waterskiing is popular. Lake Billy Chinook has many little coves to anchor the houseboat.

Roughly built float houses are sometimes called shanty boats but may be built on a raft or hull. In historic logging operations, workmen sometimes used an ark as a mobile dwelling.

== Oceania ==
=== Australia ===
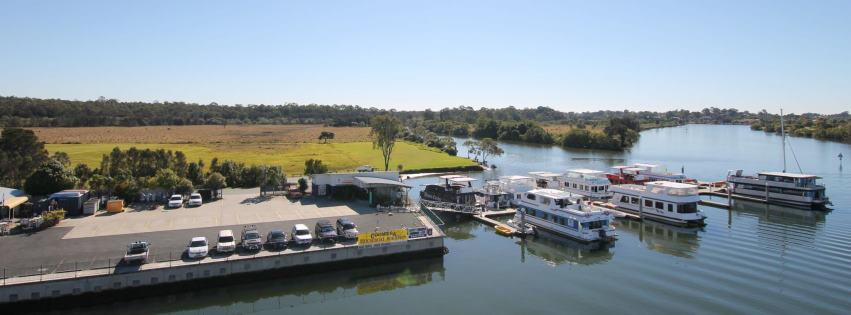
Houseboats for hire, Coomera River, Gold Coast, Australia

In Australia, especially on the Murray River (most notably the town of Mannum) and the sunny coastline of Queensland there are many motorized, pontoon-based houseboats with two or more bedrooms; some of these houseboats have more than one level or multiple stories (floors). Some are privately owned as either a primary residence or a holiday shack. Many are also available for hire (rent) as self-driven holiday destinations with accommodation for four to perhaps a dozen persons. Coomera River, the Great Sandy Straits (near the world's largest sand island - Fraser Island) and, in recent times, the Tweed River (near Barri Island during the popular Tournament Crabbing competitions) are especially popular with Queenslanders and interstate tourists. Lake Eildon in Victoria. The Hawkesbury River near Sydney in New South Wales has over 120 kms of river open to houseboats and alternatives. These include flybridge cruisers and catamarans, which also offer overnight accommodation, yet are more manoeuvrable, easier to drive and have the ability to go further afield than the traditional houseboats and have the feel of true boating. Houseboats can be limited to locations because they cannot pass under bridges safely due to manoeuvrability.

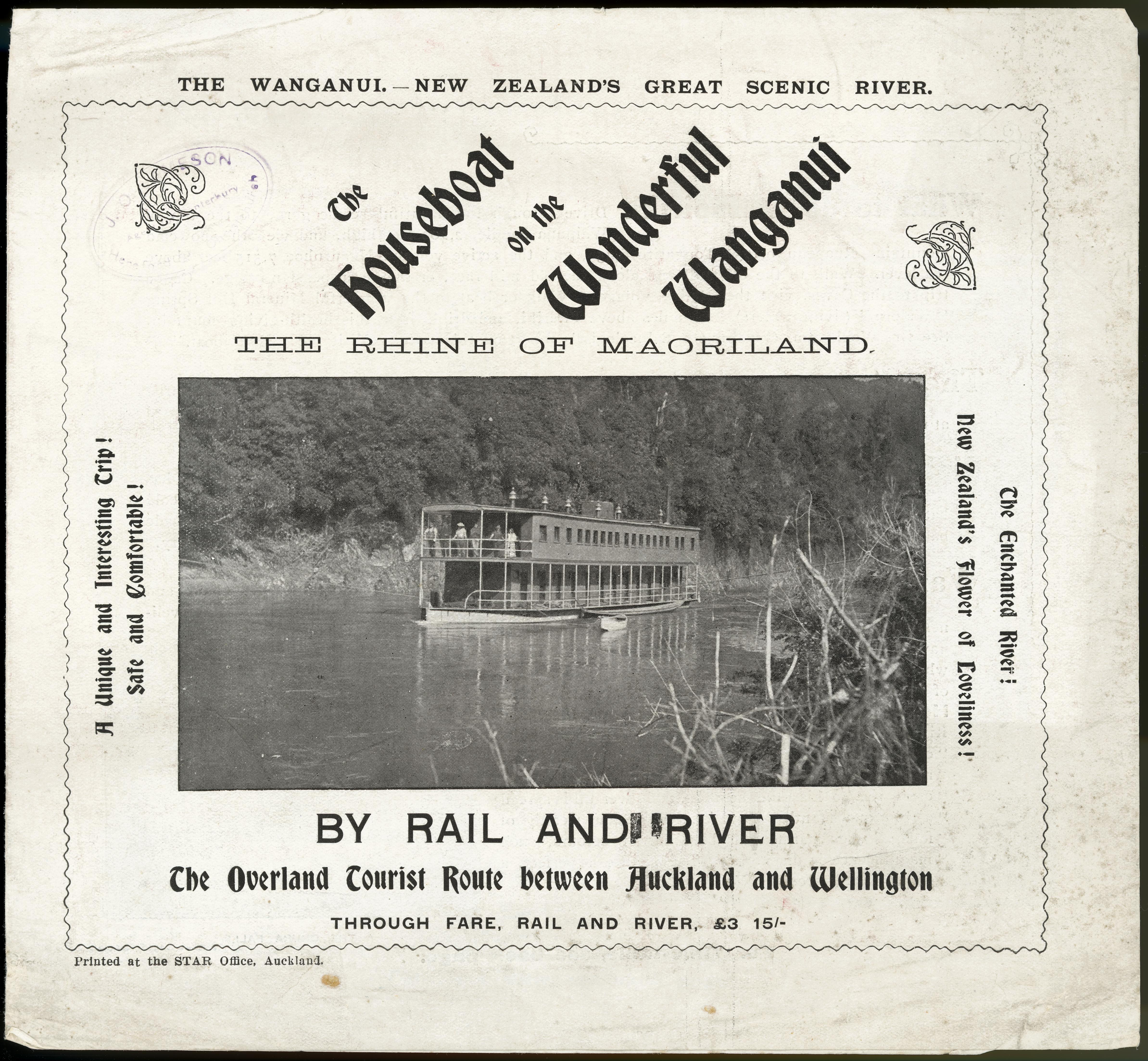
1906 advert for Whanganui's houseboat

=== New Zealand ===
In New Zealand houseboating is developing as a holiday activity. Whangaroa Harbour on Northland's east coast is a land locked harbour that provides houseboating.

Hatrick & Co launched a houseboat at Taumarunui in April 1904. It took over 4 weeks to lower her down 35 mi (56 km) of the Whanganui River, for use by December 1904. She was 98 ft (30 m) x 22 ft (6.7 m), with 60 berths on the lower deck. She caught fire and sank in 1933.

== South America ==
=== Venezuela ===
In Maracaibo, Venezuela, there is a big house called La Casa Barco (the Ship House), which was built by a former captain of the Venezuelan Navy in the 20th century. The building resembles a ship with its anchors, lifeboats, and radars, floating on water. It is located in the neighbourhood of La Estrella, and has become a city icon for tourists.

== Carbon monoxide from gasoline-powered generators ==
A video on mitigating carbon monoxide hazards from houseboats

Many houseboats use gasoline-powered generators. The carbon monoxide (CO) exhaust from these generators has caused problems for some houseboat inhabitants. The US National Institute for Occupational Safety and Health, in tandem with the US National Park Service and the U.S. Coast Guard, performed a number of evaluations on air quality, particularly carbon monoxide levels, on houseboats beginning in August 2000. Since that initial investigation, over 600 boating-related poisonings in the United States have been identified, over 100 of which caused death. Over 250 of the poisonings occurred on houseboats, more than 200 of which were attributed to generator exhaust alone. Some houseboat and generator manufacturers have begun working with these agencies to evaluate engineering controls to reduce CO concentrations in occupied areas on houseboats.

== Gallery ==
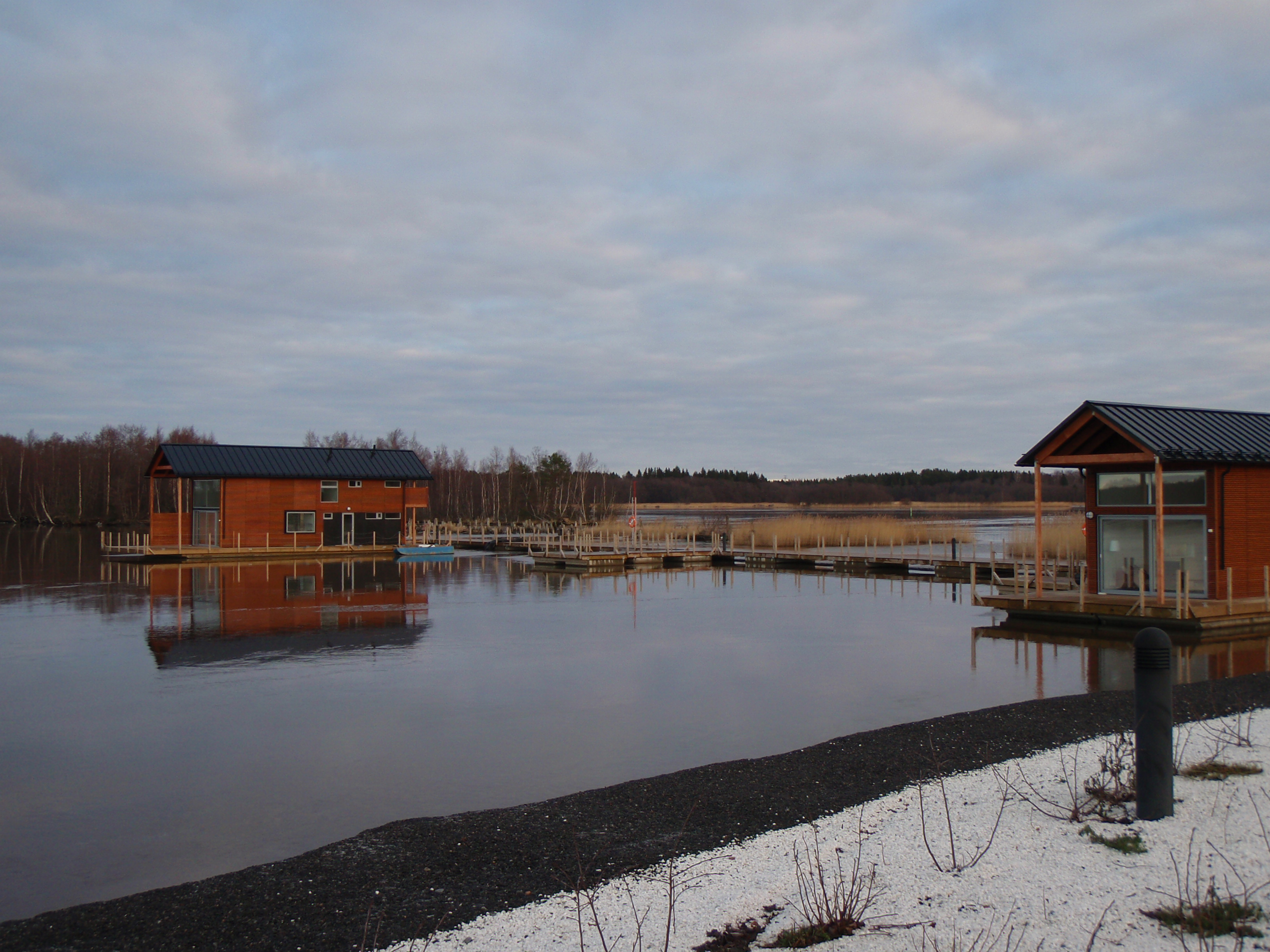
Houseboats at Reposaari, Pori, Satakunta, Finland

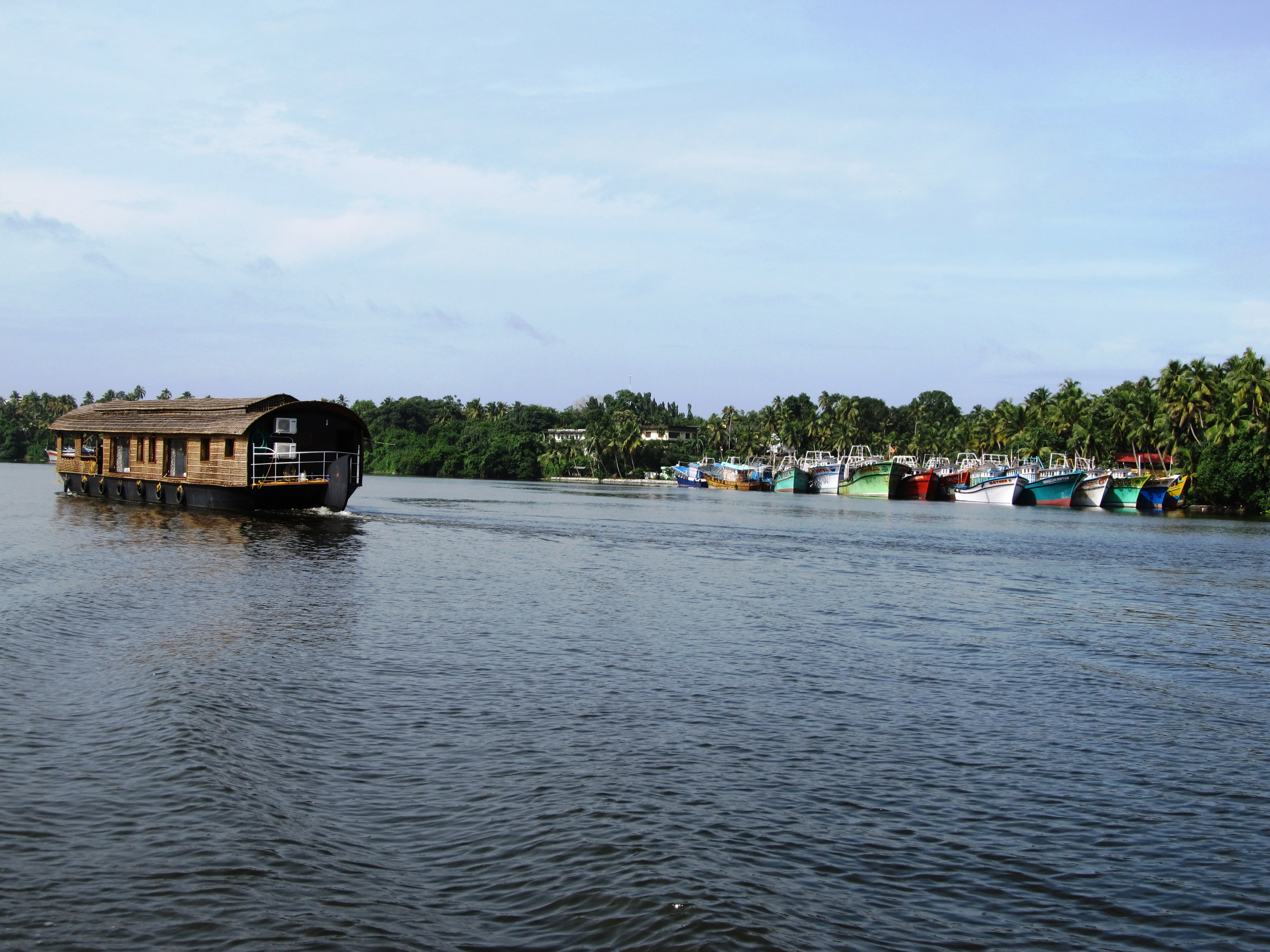
A houseboat on Ashtamudi Lake in Kollam, India

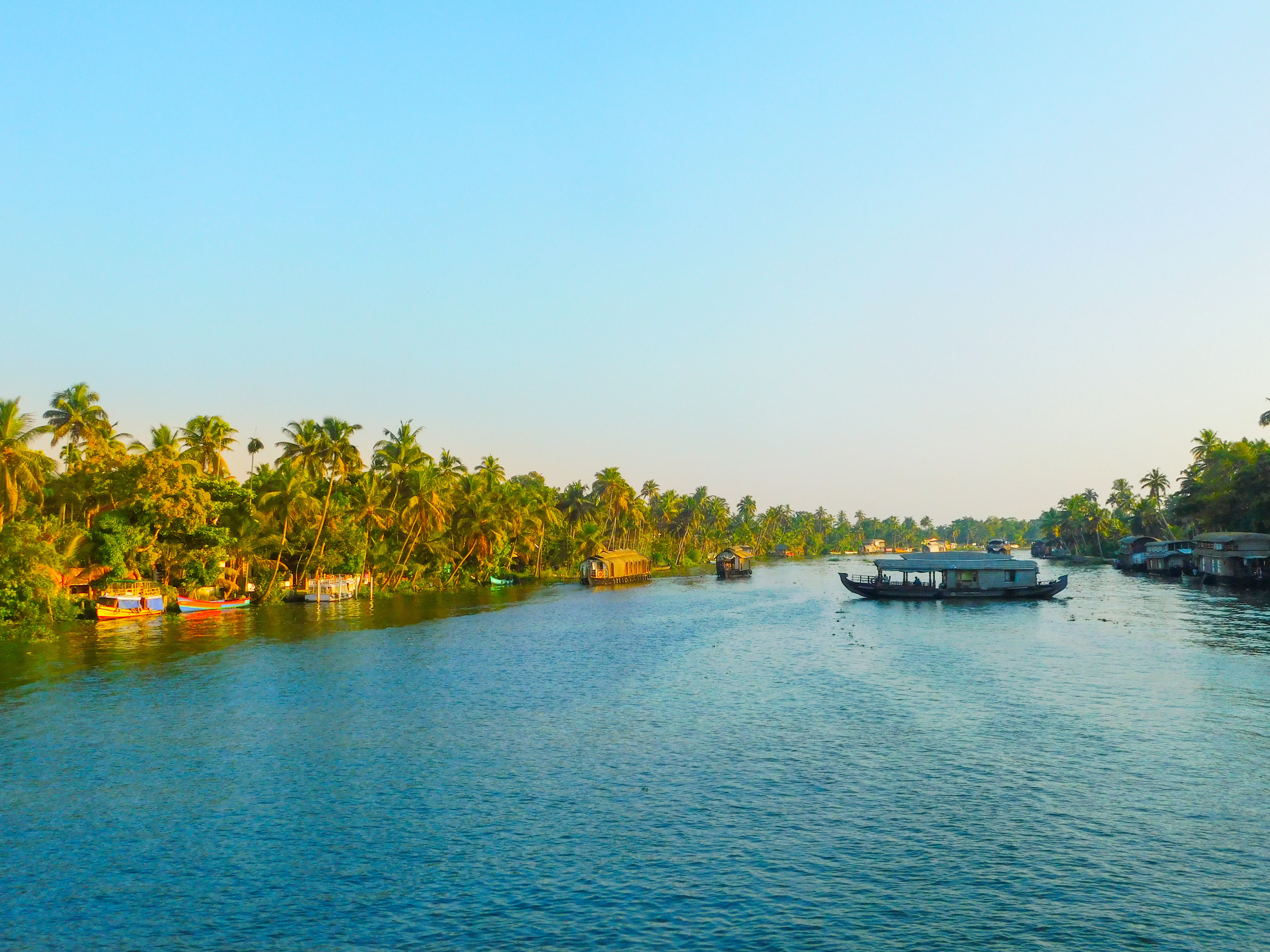
Houseboat at Vembanad, Kumarakom, Kerala, India

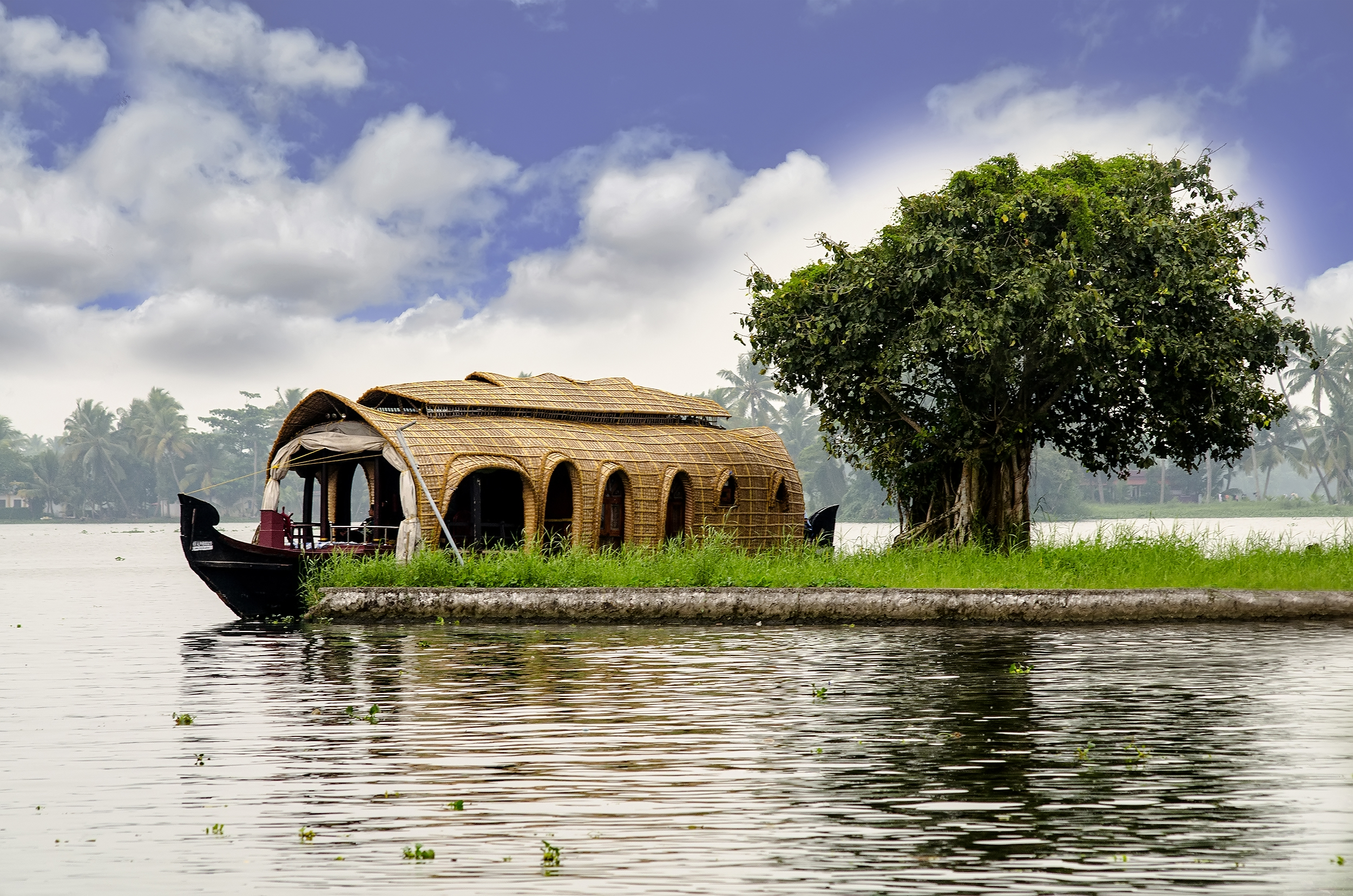
A Kerala house boat in Alappuzha, India

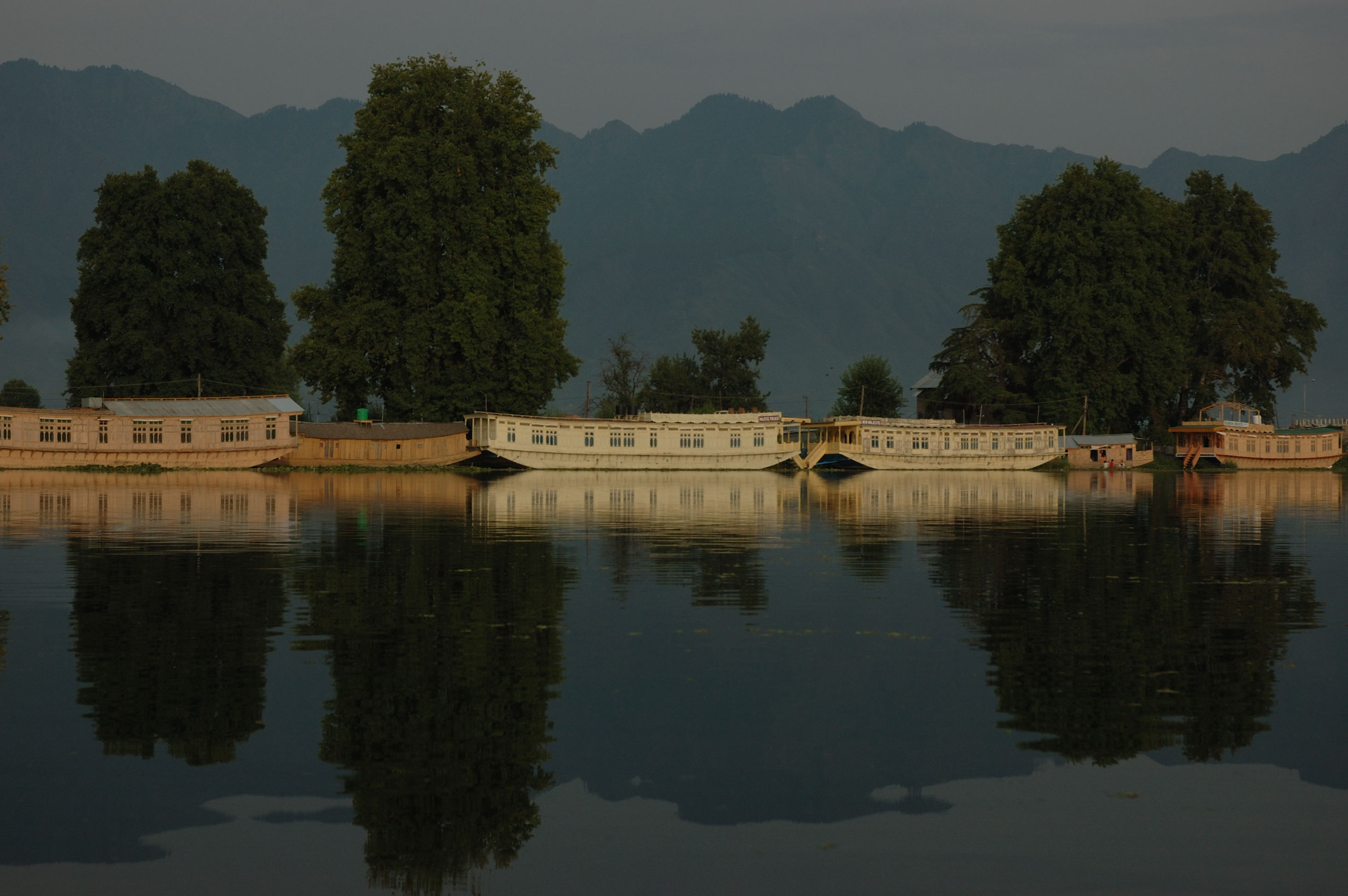
Houseboats on Nageen Lake, Srinagar, Jammu and Kashmir, India

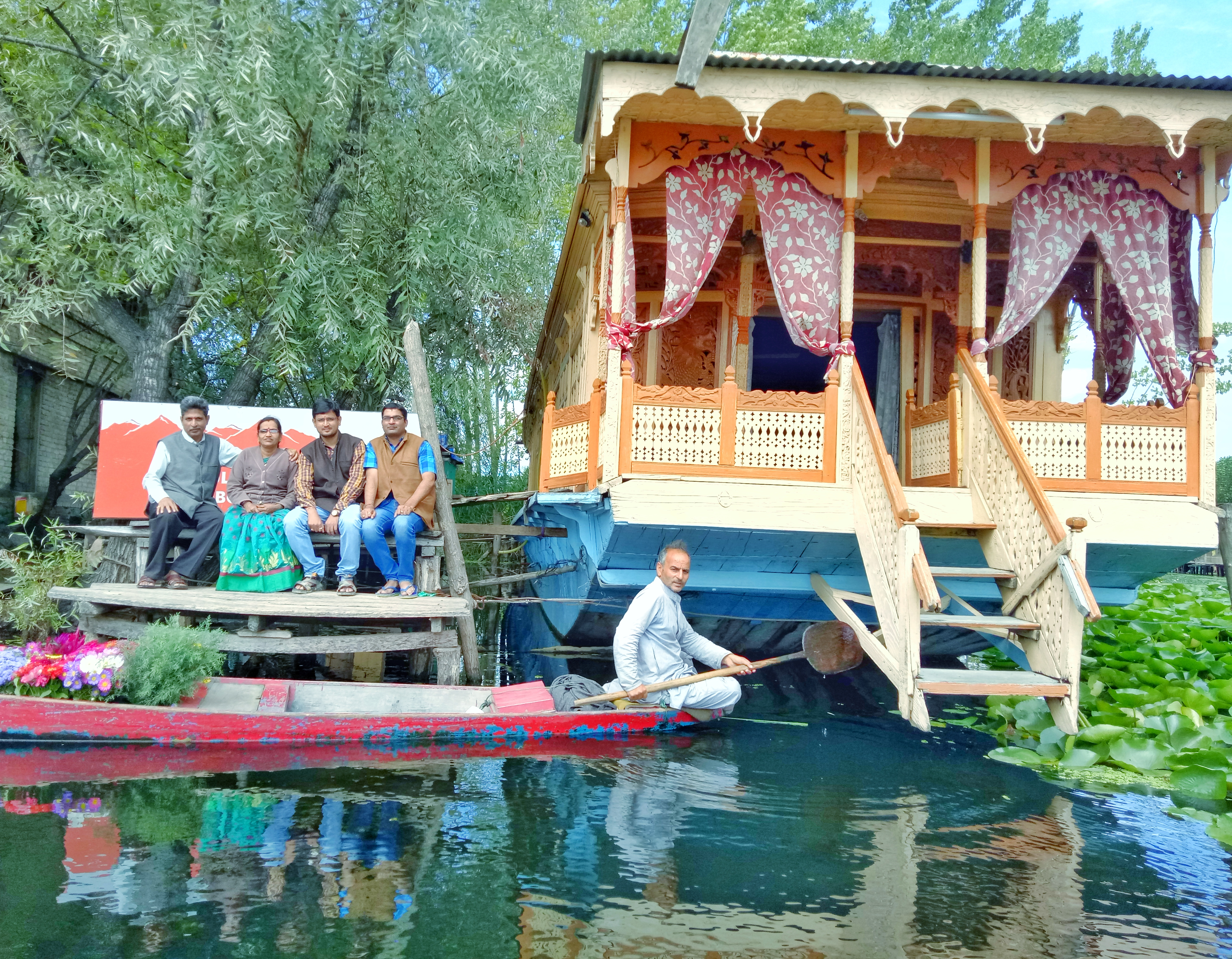
Kashmir Houseboats New Bul Bul Group of houseboats

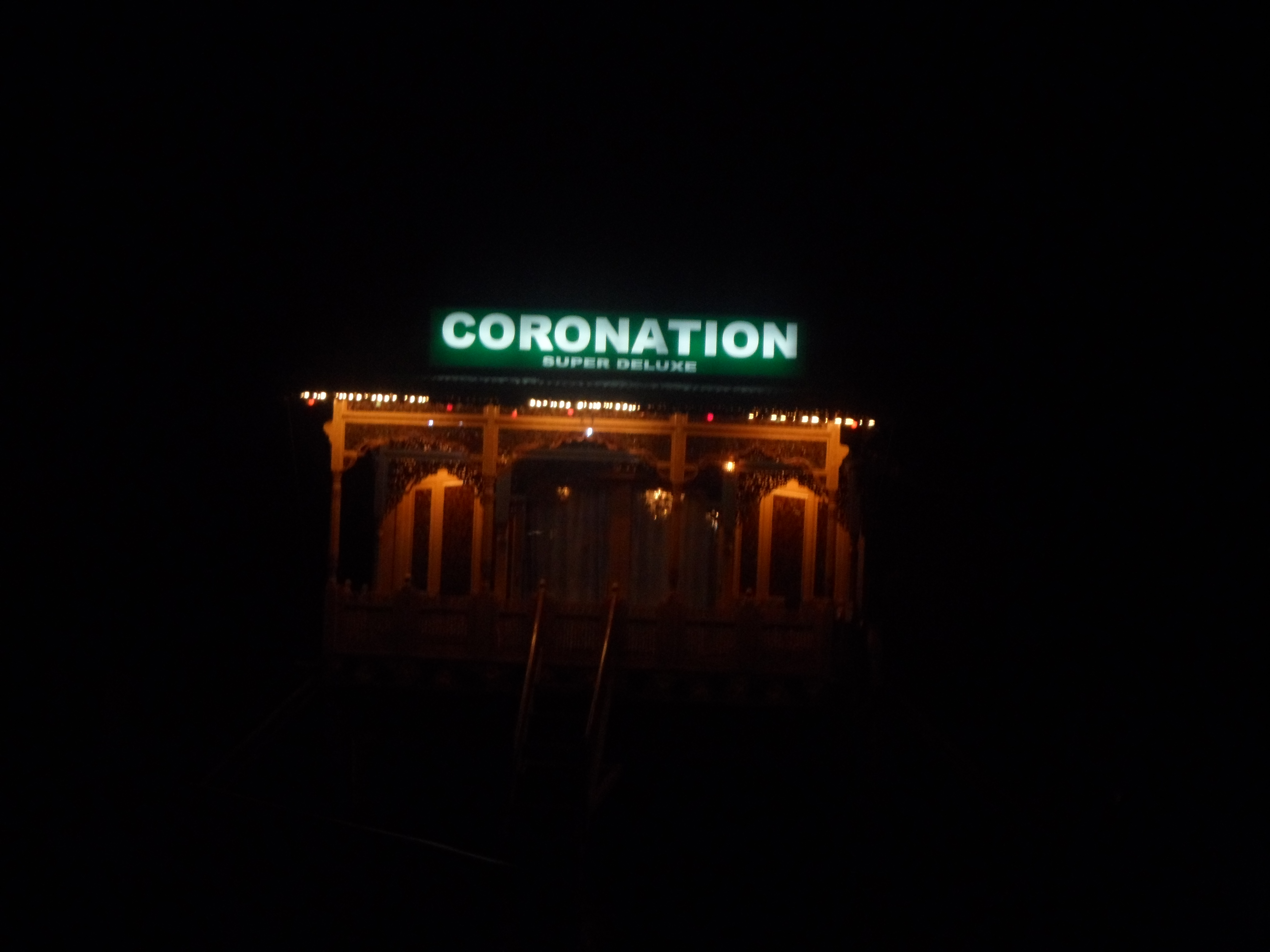
Houseboat at night

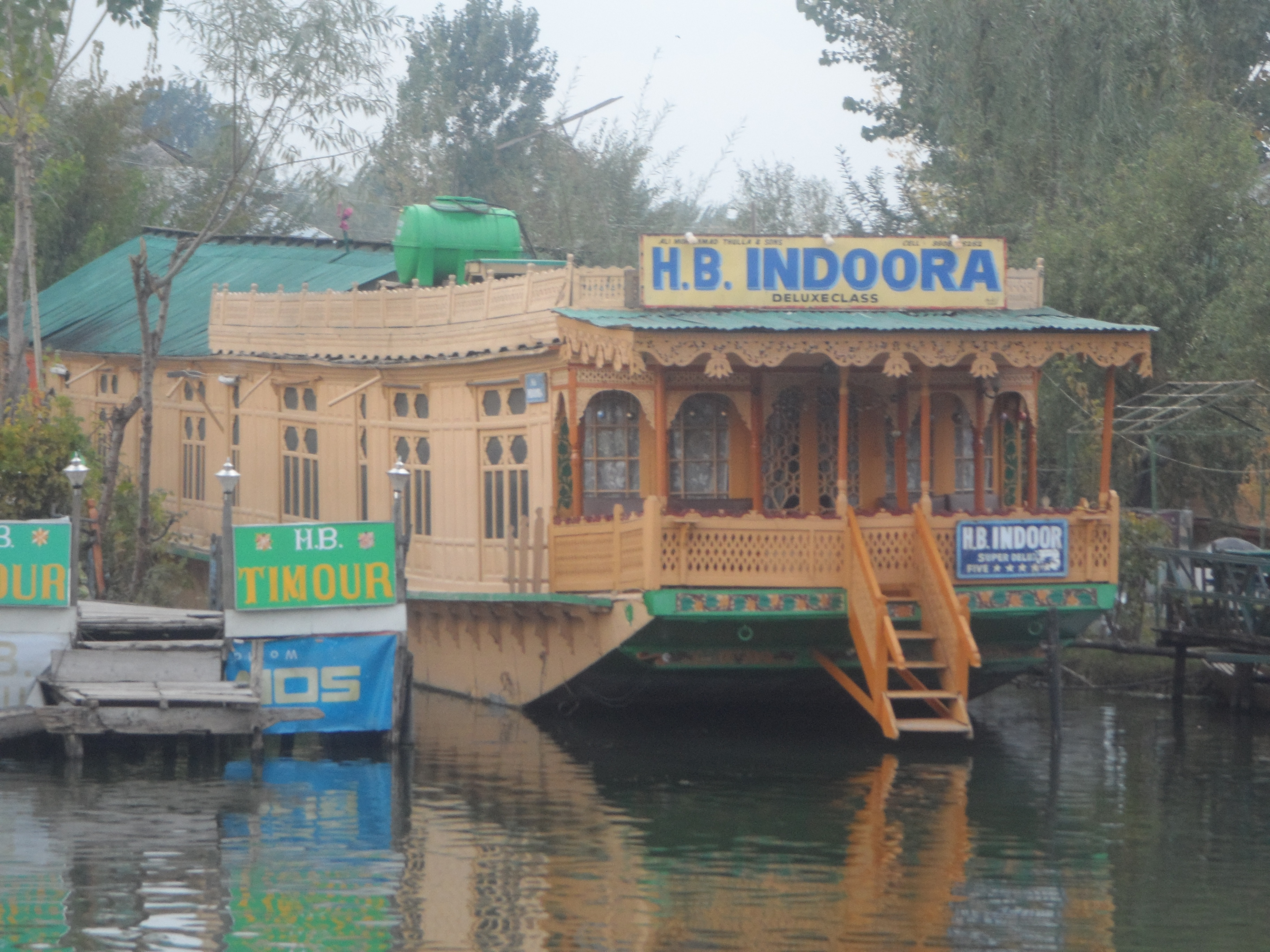
Houseboat H. B. Indoora

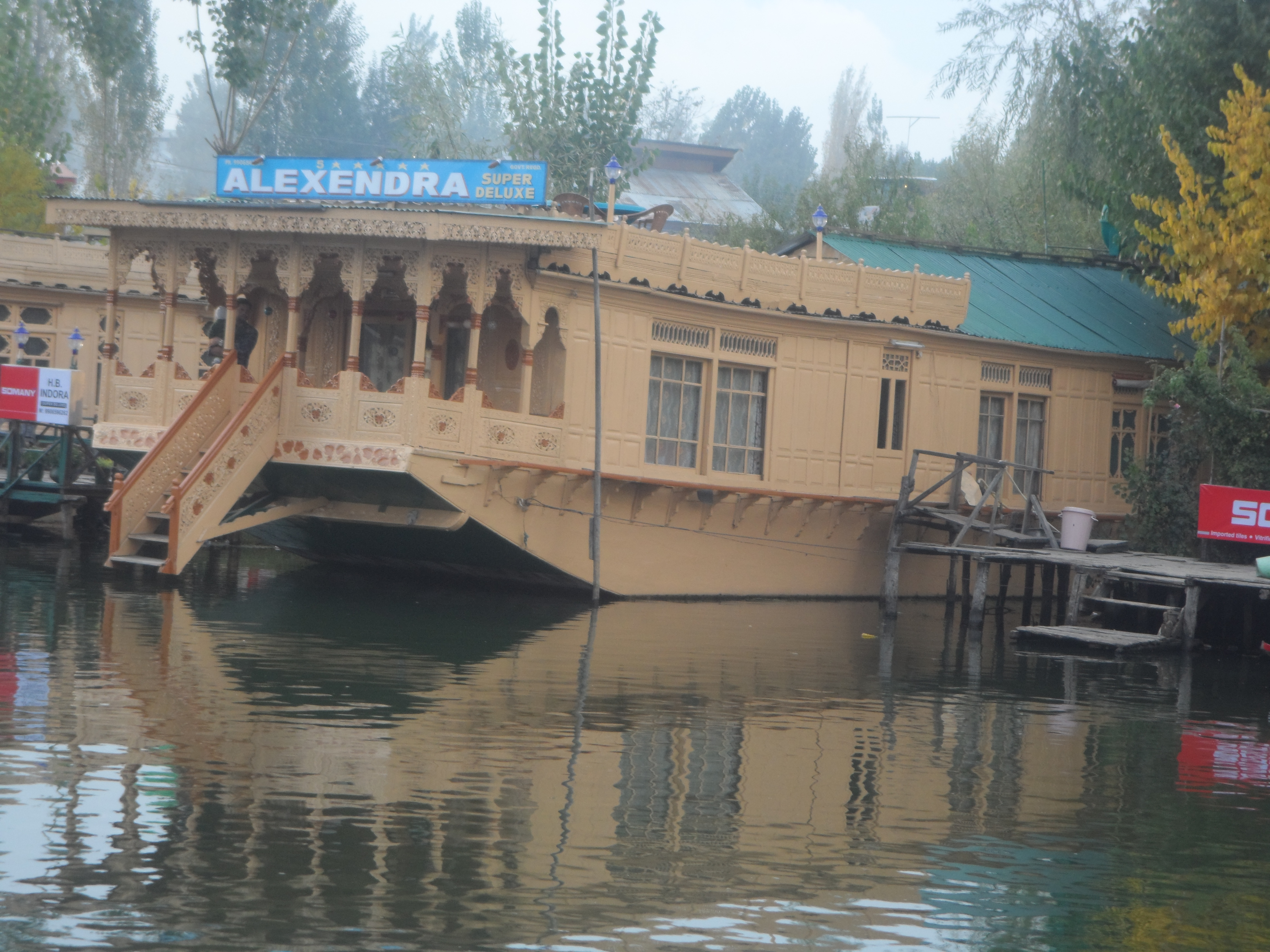
Alexzandra Houseboat

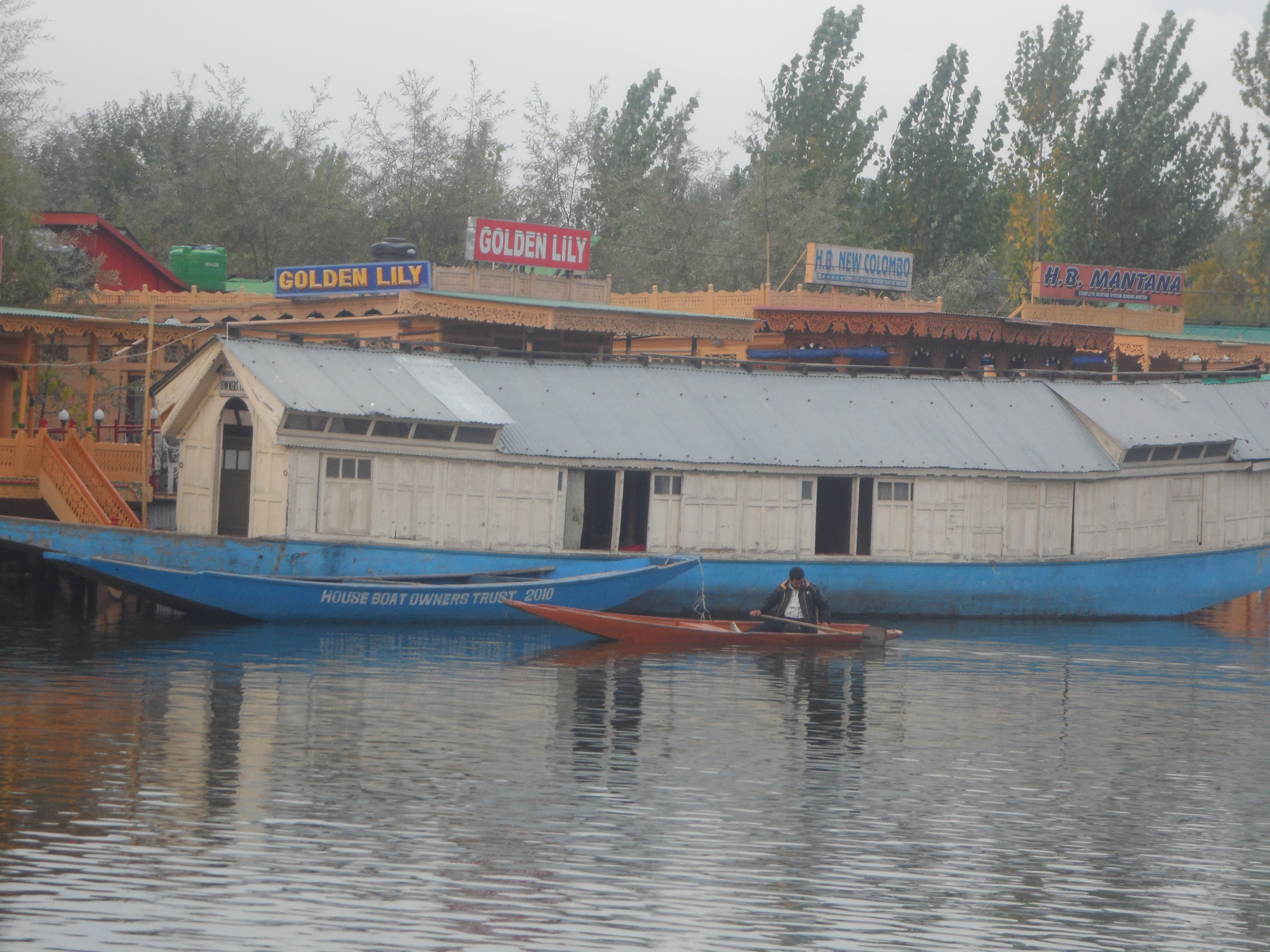
Houseboat at Dal Lake

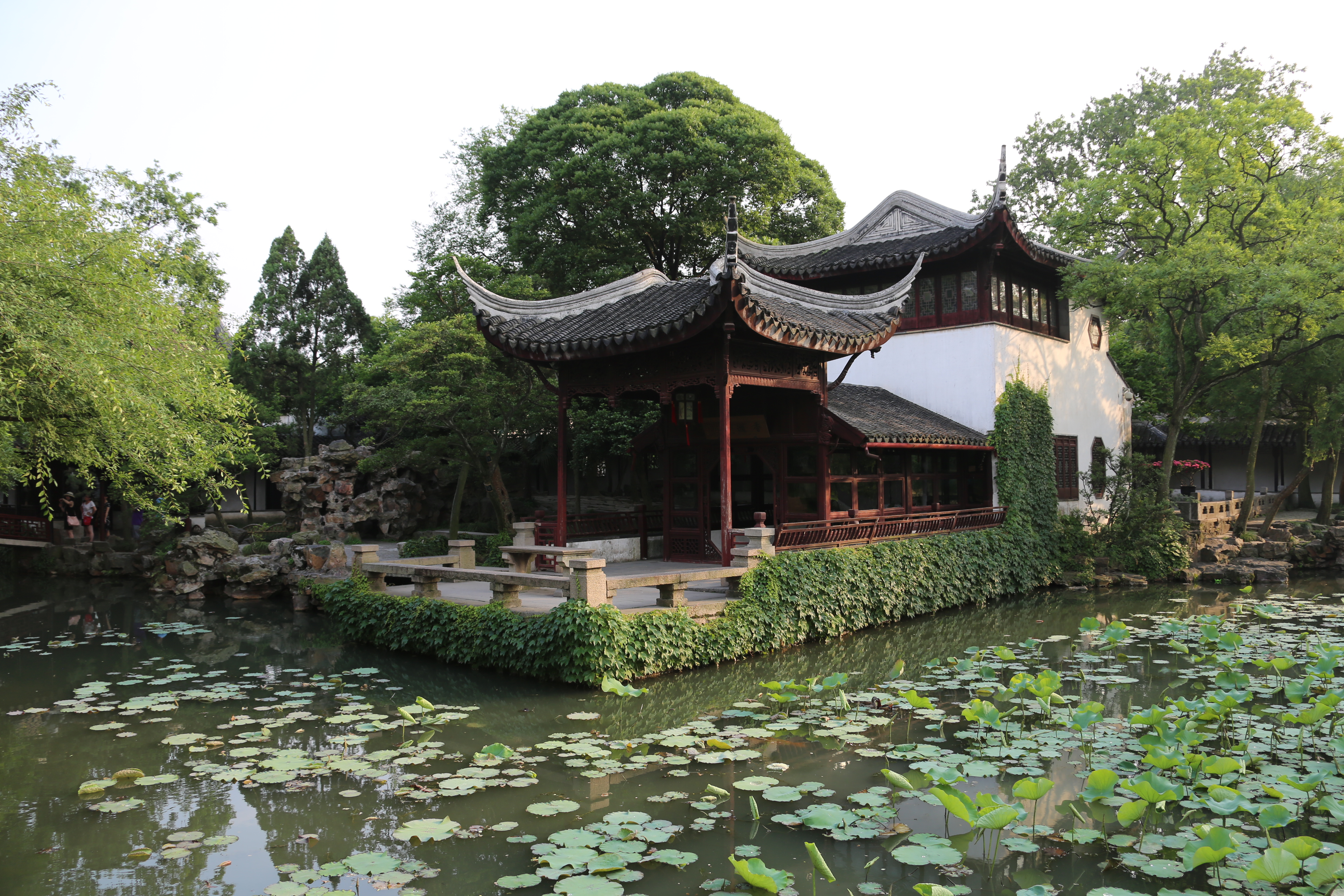
Houseboat in the Humble Administrator's Garden, Suzhou, China

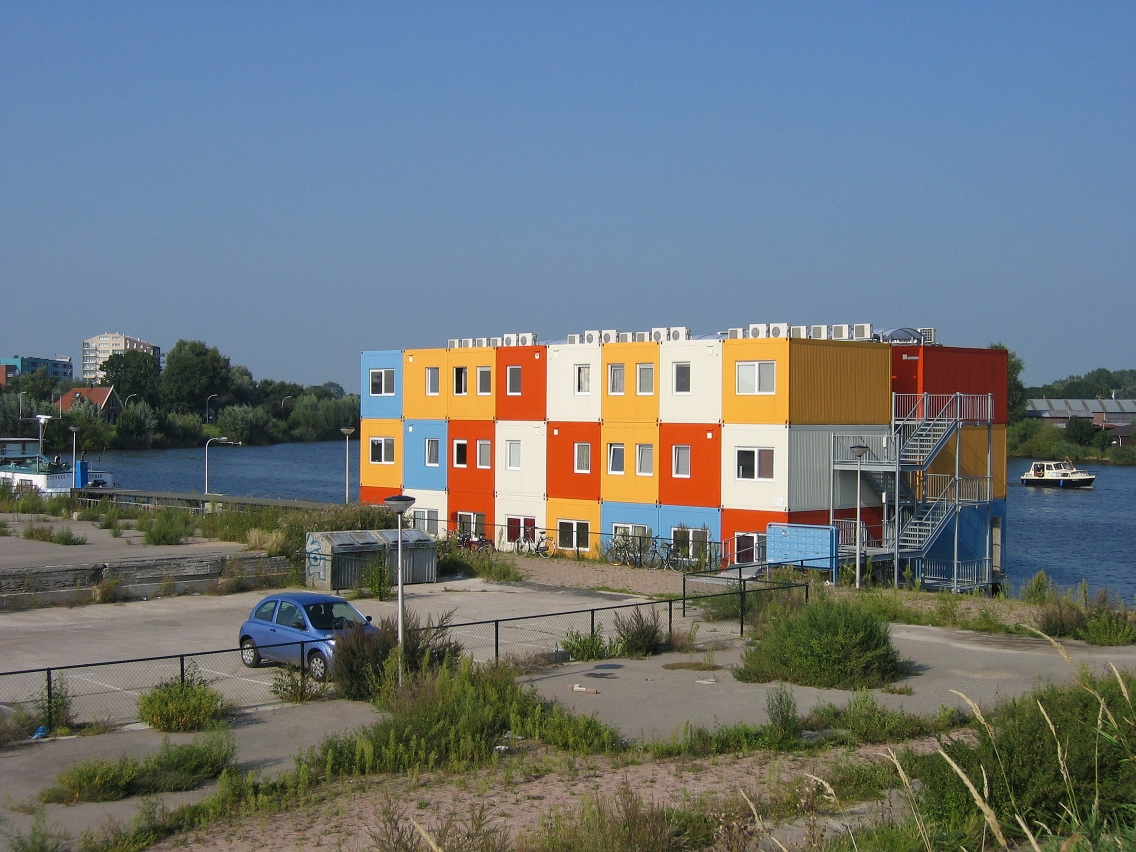
Houseboat for students in Zwolle, Netherlands

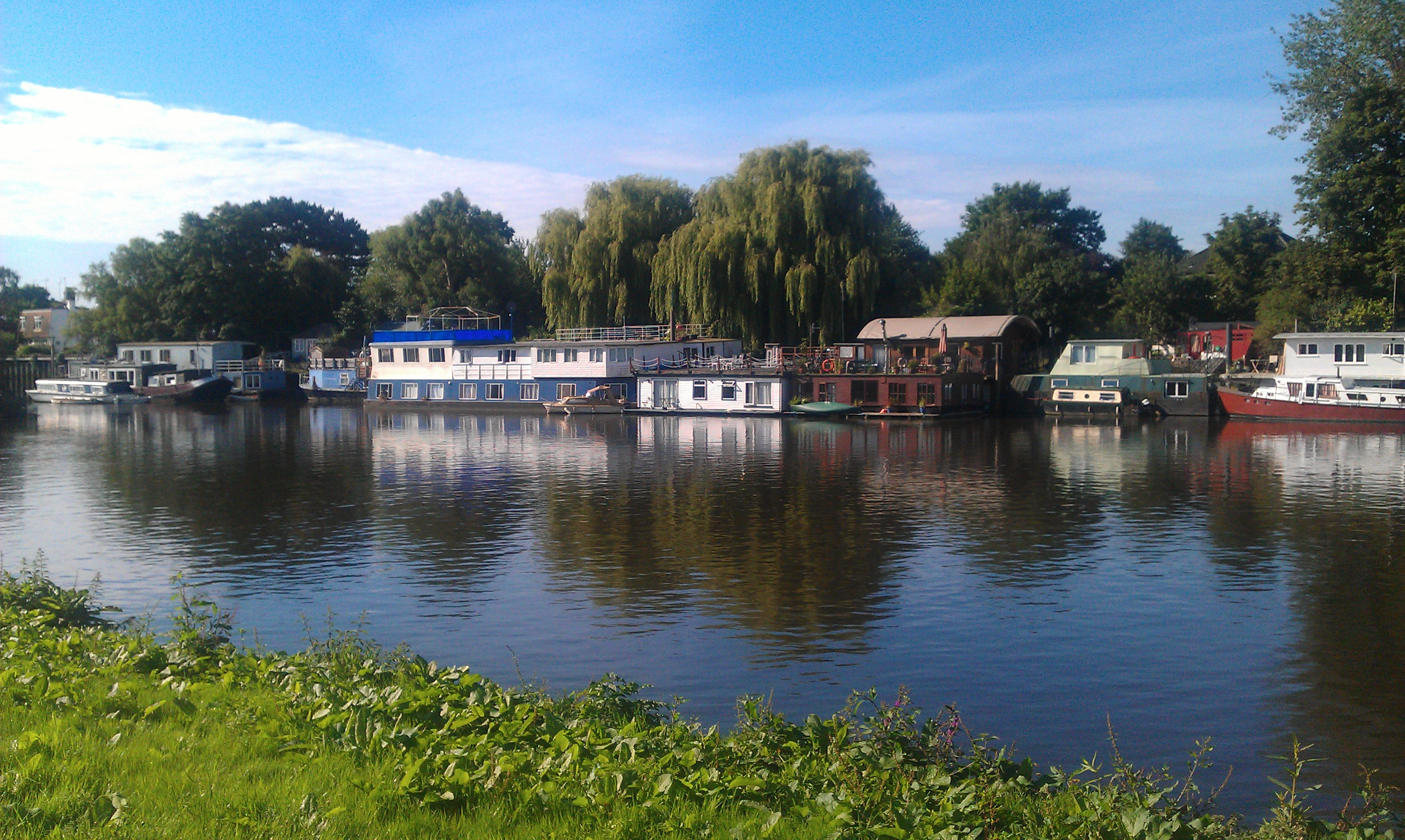
Houseboats in Richmond, London, England

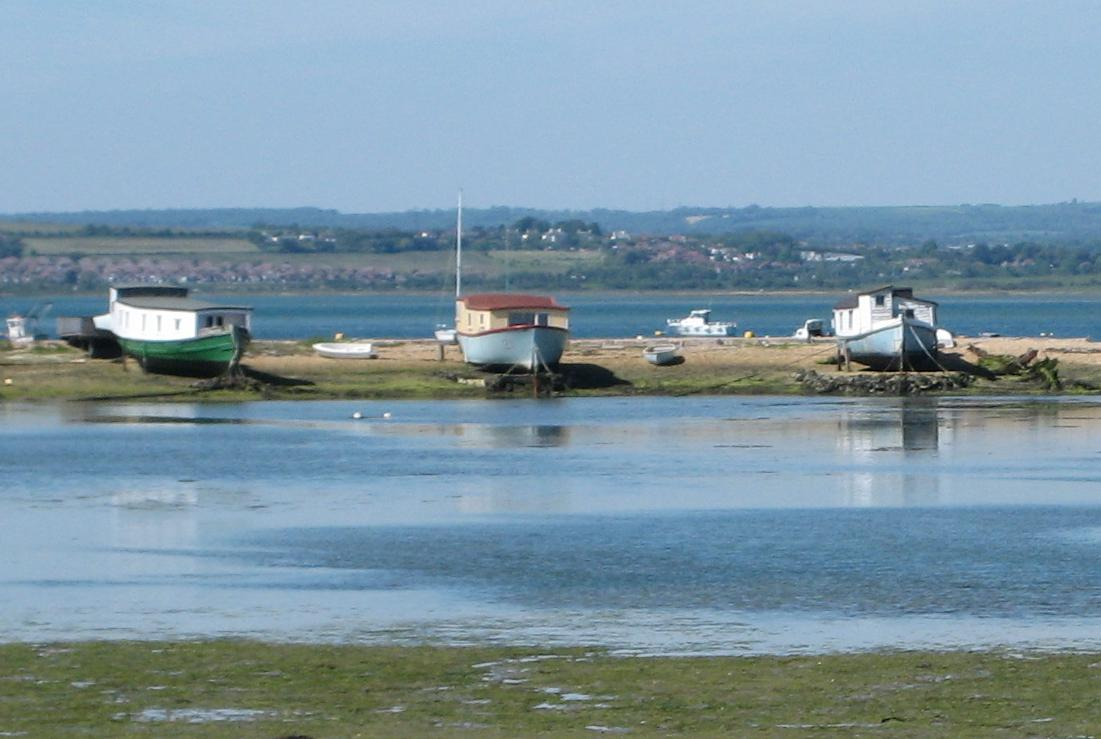
Beached hull house boats on Hayling Island, England

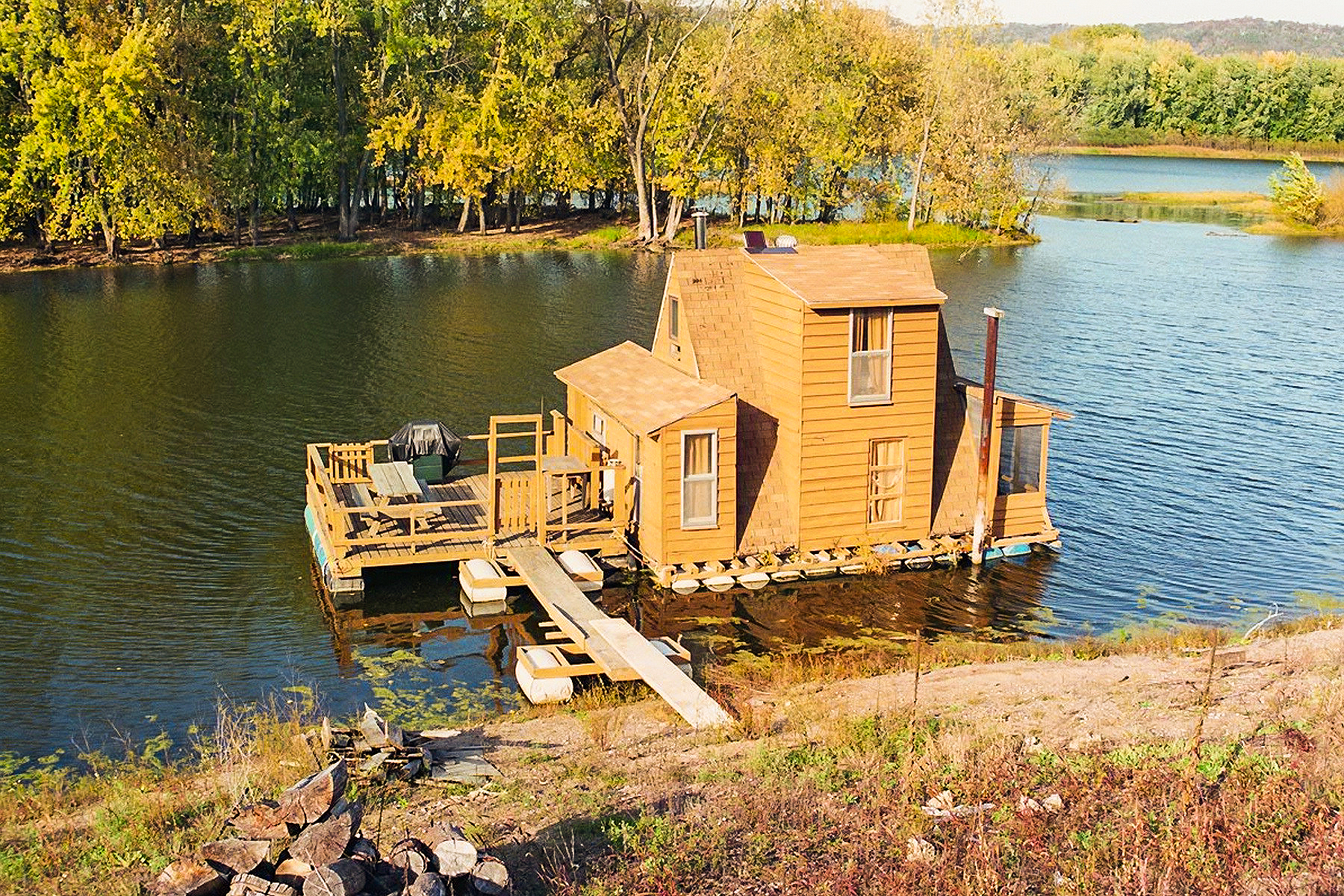
Houseboat on the Mississippi River in Wisconsin

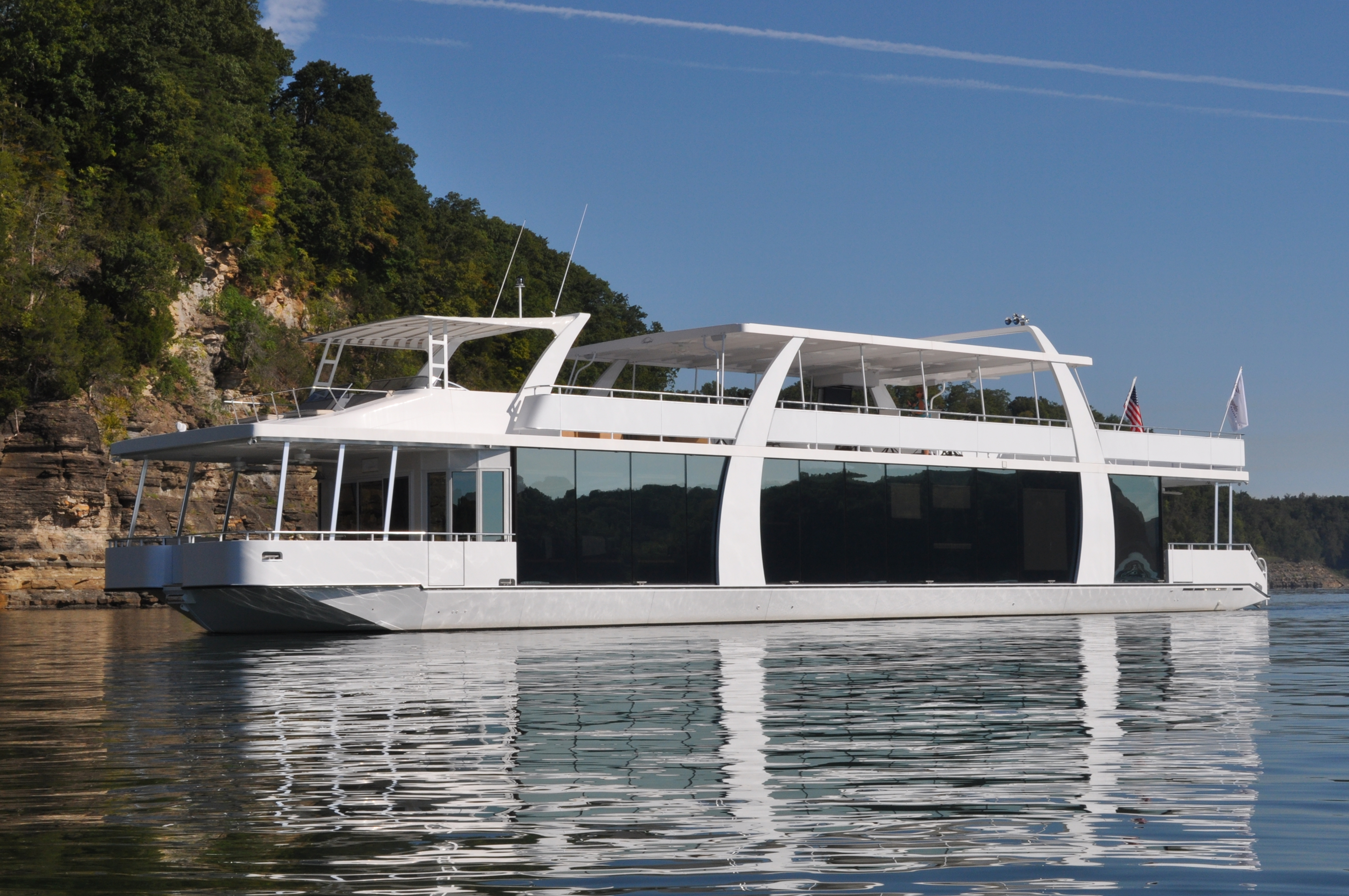
A modern houseboat in Lake Cumberland, near Albany, Kentucky, US

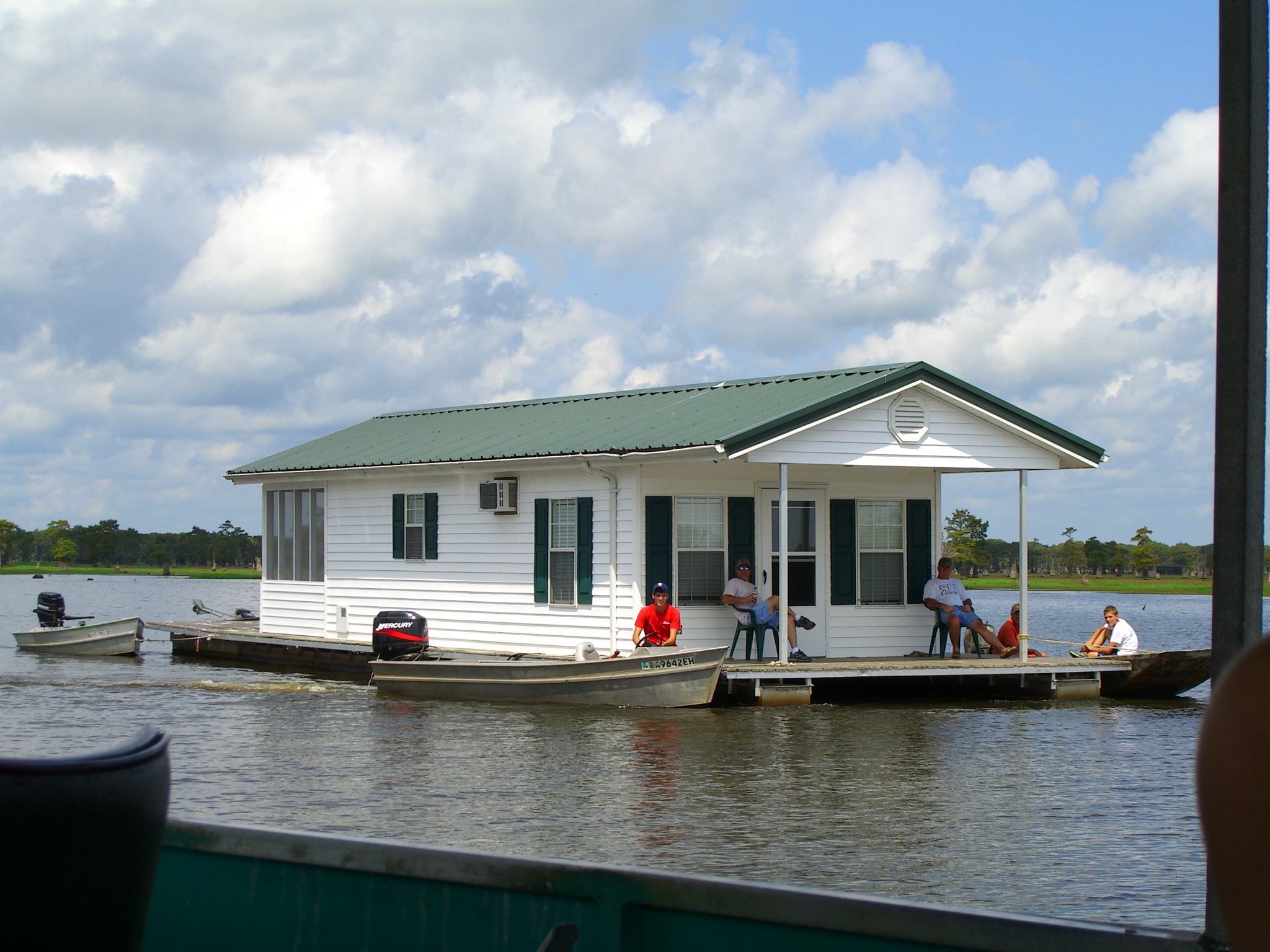
A houseboat in Lake Bigeaux, near Henderson, Louisiana, US

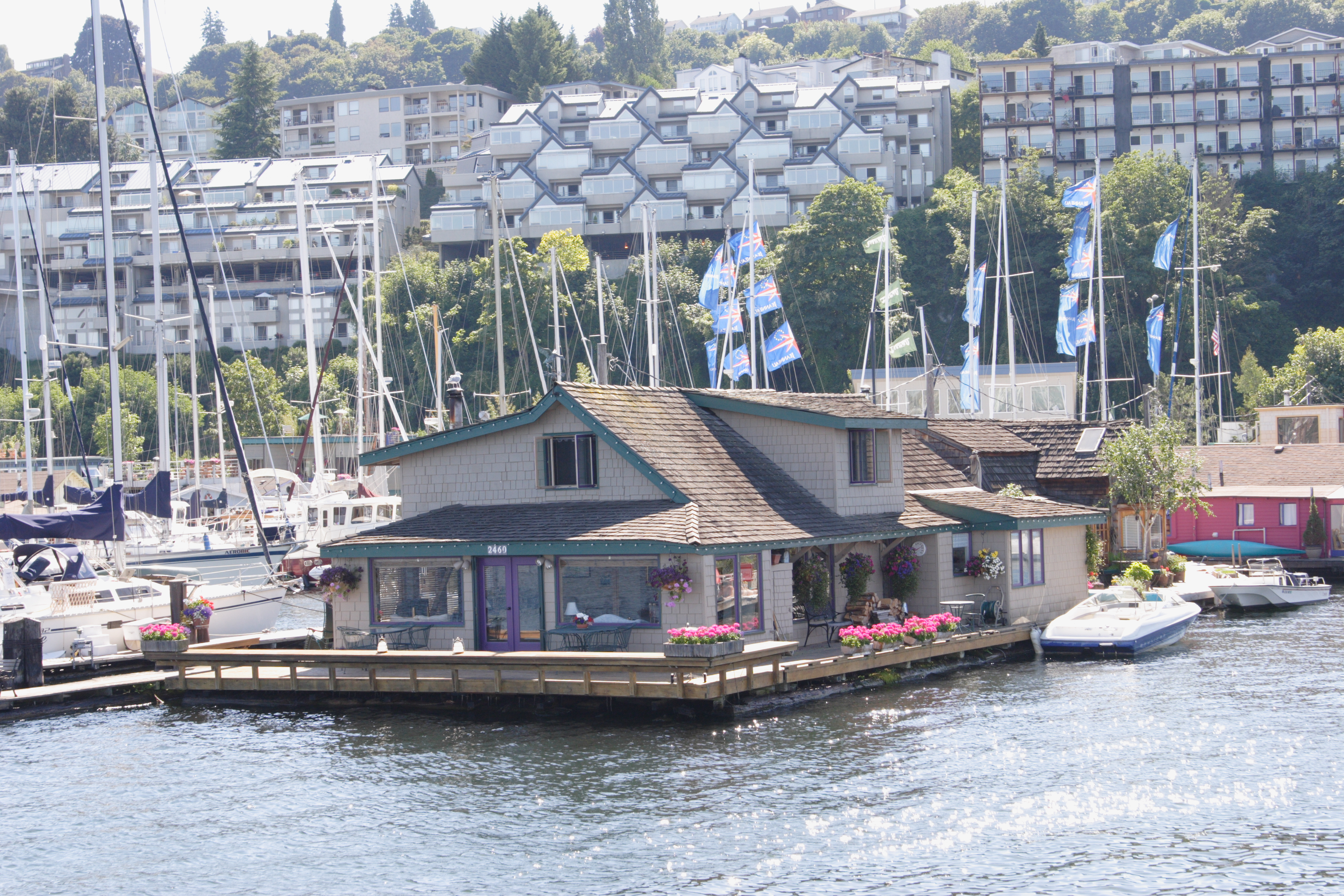
Seattle houseboat prominently featured in the film Sleepless in Seattle

== See also ==
- Barracks ship
- Boathouse, a structure which stores boats and boating equipment
- Botel
- Cabin cruiser
- Floating Hospital
- Floating restaurant
- Hotelship
- Hulk (ship type)
- Kettuvallam
- Prison ship
- Seasteading
- Stilt house
- YHB, the US Navy hull classification symbol for a houseboat
