= Kadijken =

De Kadijken
- Neighborhood of Amsterdam
- Interactive map of De Kadijken
- Coordinates: 52°22′8″N 4°54′56″E
- Country: Netherlands
- Province: North Holland
- COROP: Amsterdam
- Time zone: UTC+1 (CET)

The Kadijken (Dutch pronunciation: [kaːˈdɛikə(n)]), also known as Kadijkseiland [kaːˈdɛiks.ɛiˌlɑnt] or Kadijkenbuurt [kaːˈdɛikə(m)ˌbyːrt], is a neighbourhood to the north of Artis zoo in the centre of Amsterdam. The name Kadijken is the plural form of Kadijk and refers to the two main streets that traverse the neighbourhood, Hoogte Kadijk ("Upper Kadijk") and Laagte Kadijk ("Lower Kadijk").

== Description ==
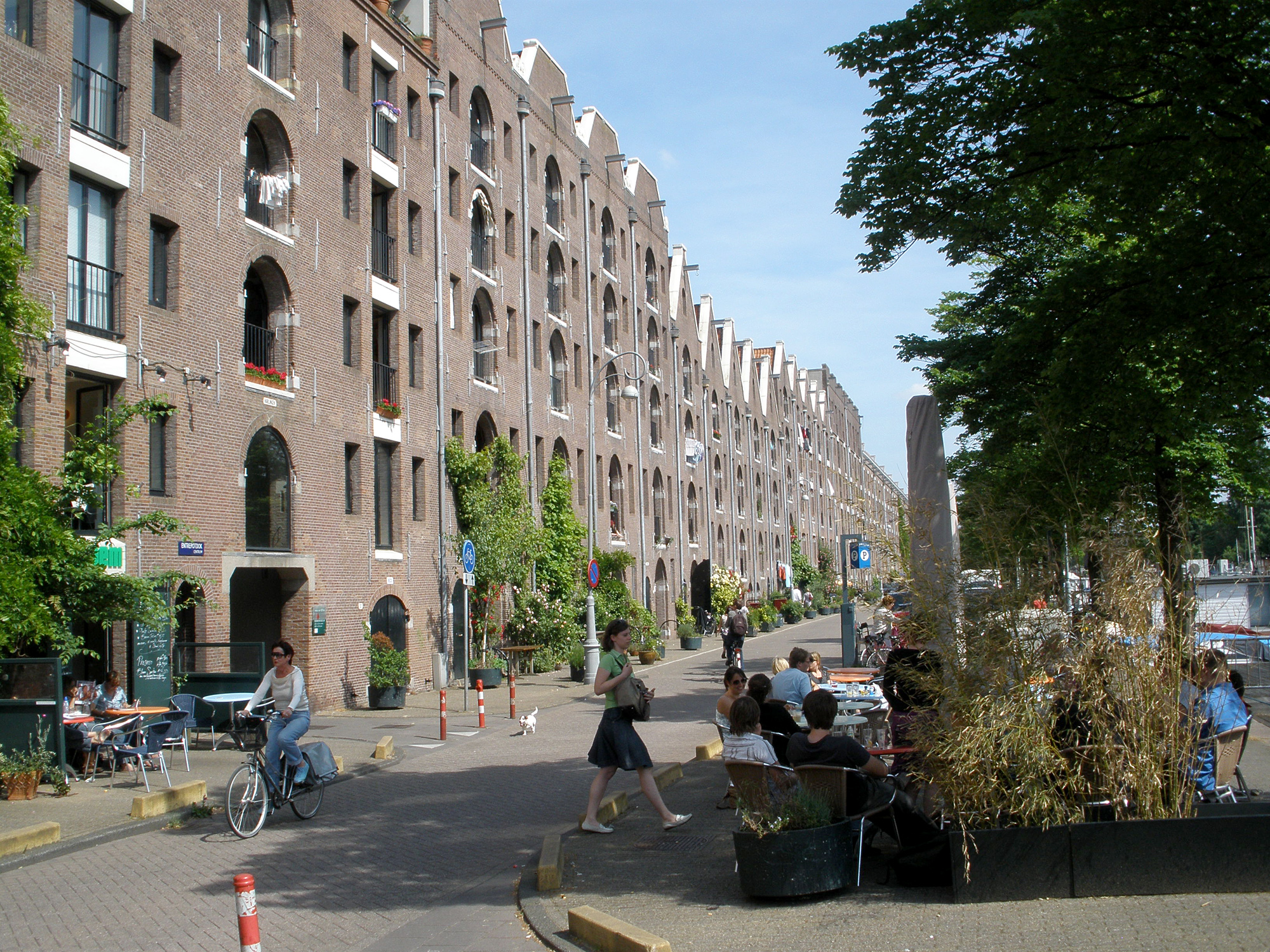
Entrepotdok viewed from the Nijlpaardenbrug bridge

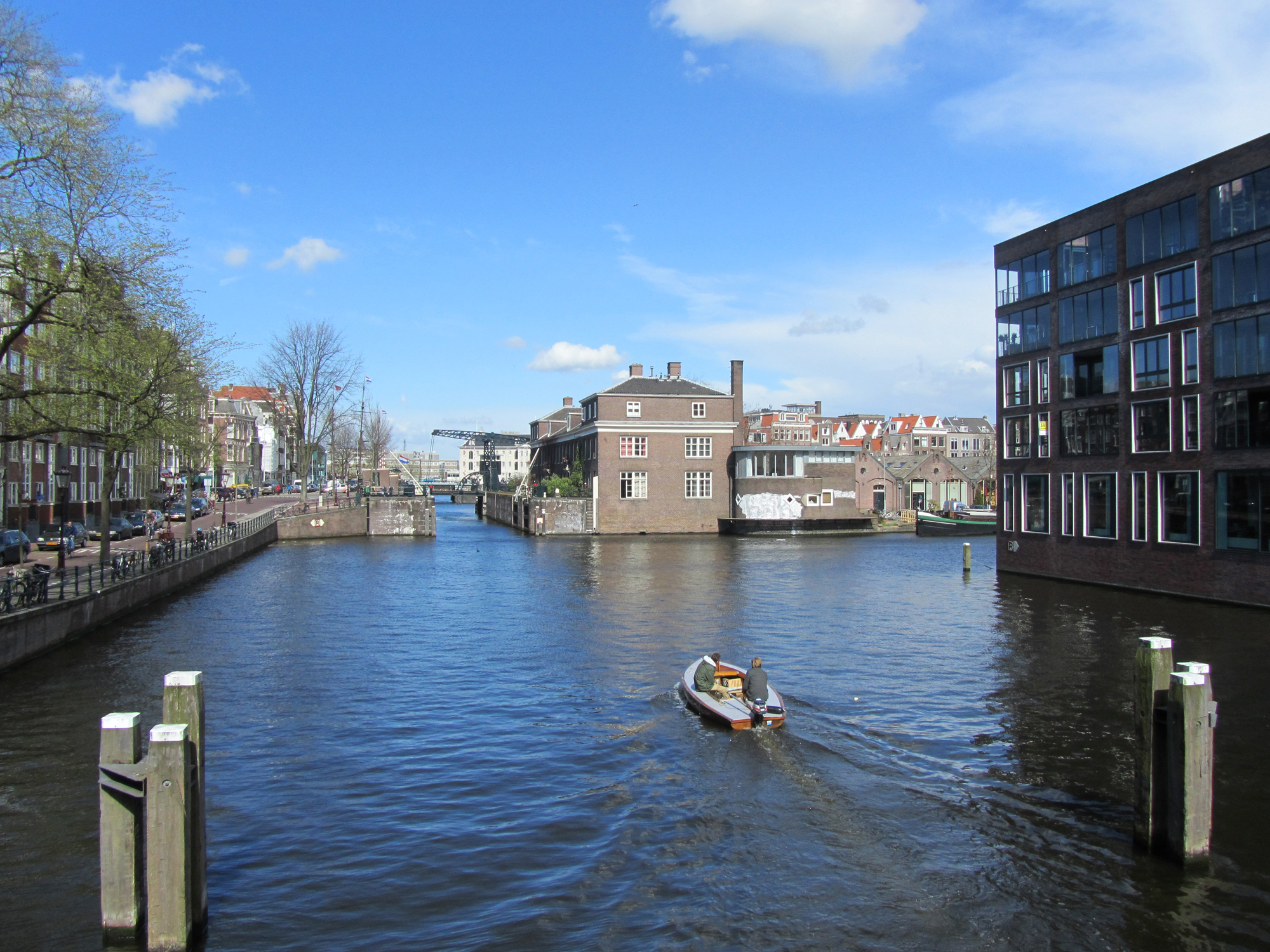
Southwestern point of the Kadijken, with Nieuwe Herengracht canal (left), the Scharrebiersluis sluice gates (centre) and Entrepotdok (right)

The Kadijken, a rectangular area measuring 900 by 170 metres, is bordered by Nieuwe Herengracht and Schippersgracht to the west, Nieuwe Vaart canal to the north, Sarphatistraat street to the east, and Entrepotdok canal to the south. The neighbourhood is cut into two halves, a larger western part and a smaller eastern part, by a former complex of sluice gates that forms a canal between the Nieuwe Vaart and Entrepotdok canals. This canal isolates the western part of the neighbourhood from the rest of the city, making it a de facto island.

Connecting the two main streets, Hoogte en Laagte Kadijk, is a small street appropriately named Tussen Kadijken ("Between the Kadijken"). The small street Buiten Kadijken ("Outer Kadijken") runs from Hoogte Kadijk to Nieuwe Vaart canal. At the corner of Hoogte Kadijk and Buiten Kadijken is a pillar topped with a sculpture of a falcon with a crown on its head. This is a replica of a cast-iron sculpture that stood here for many years as a trademark of the beer brewery De Gekroonde Valk ("The Crowned Falcon"), which has been located here since the 18th century.

The western edge of the neighbourhood is formed by Kadijkenplein square with the Zeemanshuis ("Seamen's House") and the gate building of the Algemeen Rijksentrepot, both dating to the 19th century. From the square, a cast-iron bridge leads across Nieuwe Herengracht canal. Behind the bridge are the Scharrebiersluis sluice gates. Both the bridge and the sluice gates were constructed in 1906.

The neighbourhood has about 3,000 inhabitants. There are about 1,700 residences, primarily in the western part of the neighbourhood. Of those, 70% is rented (60% government-subsidised apartments and 10% private rental), and the remaining 30% is privately owned. The eastern part of the neighbourhood is less residential; this area is dominated by offices and workshops.

The many former warehouses and shipyards in the Kadijken are a reminder of the neighbourhood's past as an area of town dominated by shipping and industry. Werfmuseum 't Kromhout and Koning William, both on Hoogte Kadijk, are still in use as shipyards. The eastern hall of Werfmuseum 't Kromhout is now a museum.

The neighbourhood has a large number of rijksmonumenten (national monuments), including the warehouses on Entrepotdok, the Sibbelwoningen on Hoogte Kadijk and a series of 17th- and 18th-century houses.

== History ==
The Kadijken were created during the fourth 17th-century expansion of Amsterdam, completed in 1663, in which an area of land beyond the dikes protecting the eastern side of Amsterdam was added to the city. In this area, a kadijk-type dike, the Nieuwe Zeedijk, had been constructed beyond the original Sint Antoniesdijk dike. A kadijk is the outer, lower dike (levee) within a set of two dikes to keep a river (or, in this instance, the IJ bay), from flooding. During the city expansion, the Nieuwe Zeedijk was raised and the higher part was called Hoogte Kadijk, while the lower part lying behind the dike came to be called Laagte Kadijk.

The Kadijken rapidly developed into an area dominated by shipyards. The south side was originally used for recreation, but from the early part of the 18th century this part of the neighbourhood was filled with warehouses and other buildings for storage of goods. In 1827 the Rapenburgergracht, as the canal along the southern edge of the neighbourhood was called, was taken over by the Dutch national government. The government established the Algemeen Rijksentrepot there, which allowed goods in transit to be temporarily stored and transferred from one ship to another without the need to pay excise duties. With a total of 96 warehouses stretching 800 metres, this was one of the largest complexes of warehouses in Europe. The Rapenburgergracht was renamed Entrepotdok.

The industrial character of the neighbourhood did not start to fade until the 20th century. From the 1970s onwards, hundreds of government-subsidised apartments were built, both in former warehouses and in newly constructed buildings.

The museum EnergeticA was located in a former power station from 1903 on Hoogte Kadijk. The museum closed in 2007, and the collection was taken over by science centre NEMO.

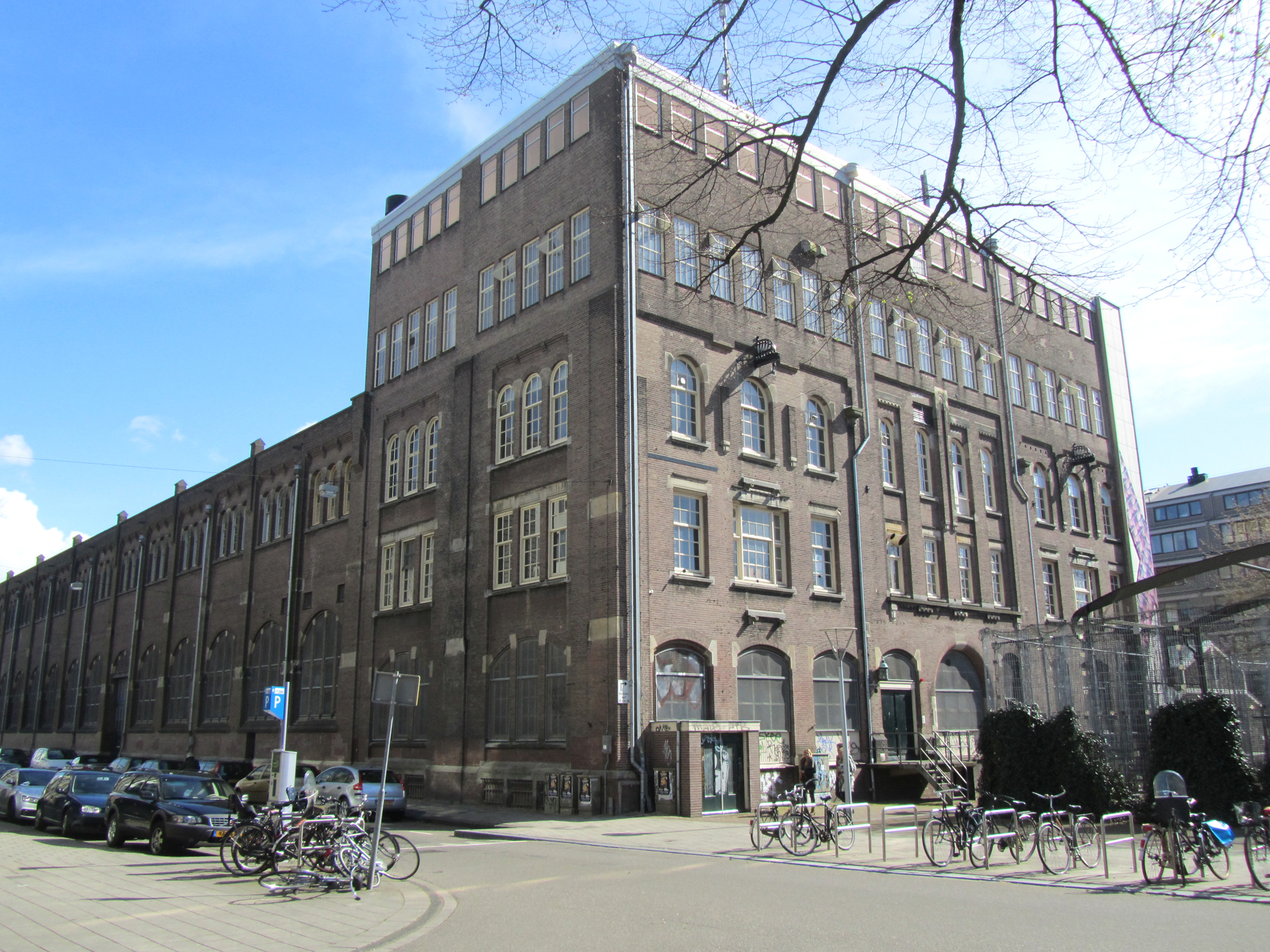
Former power station on Hoogte Kadijk

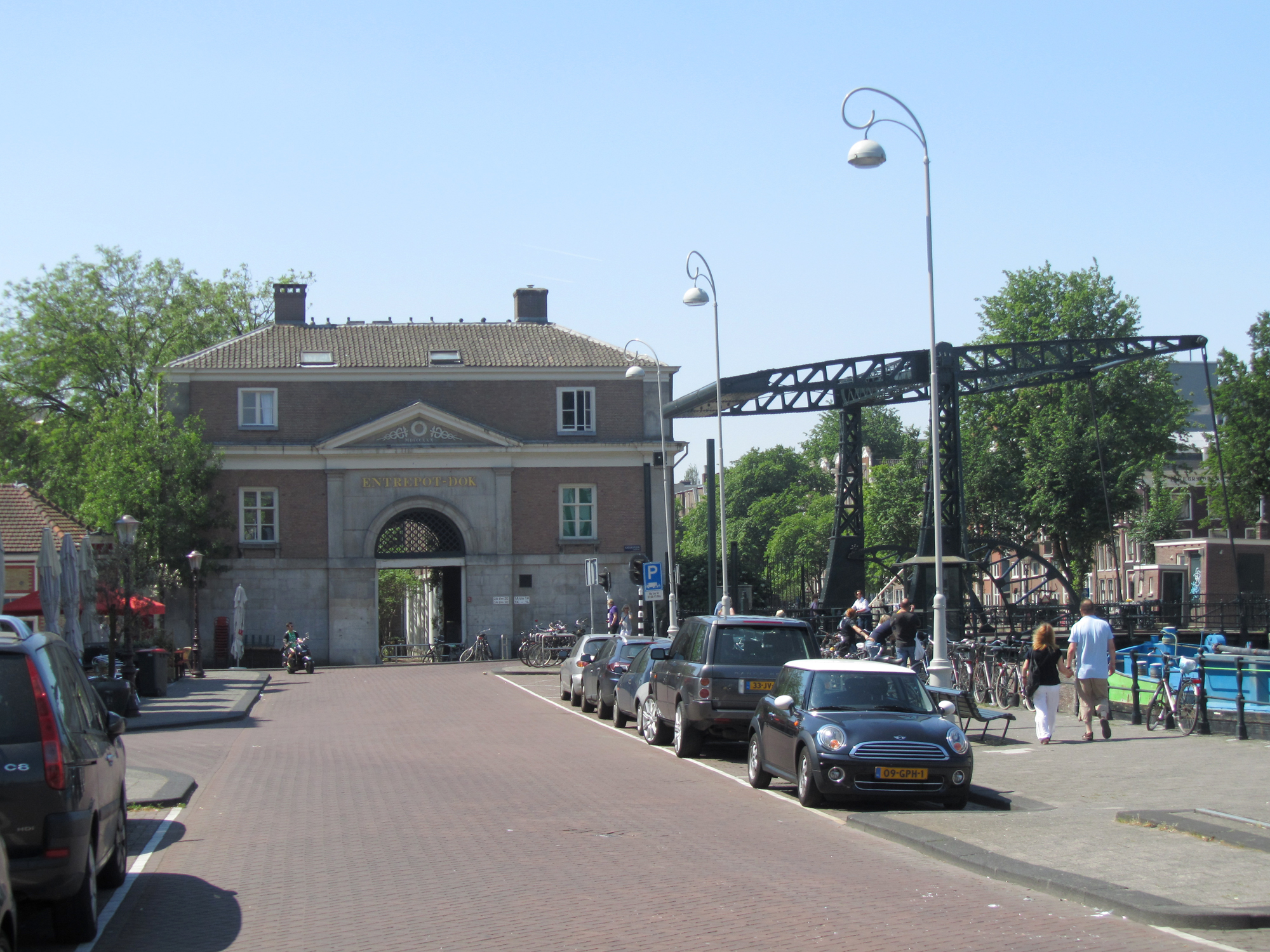
Kadijksplein square with the cast-iron bridge over Nieuwe Herengracht canal and the gate building of the Algemeen Rijksentrepot

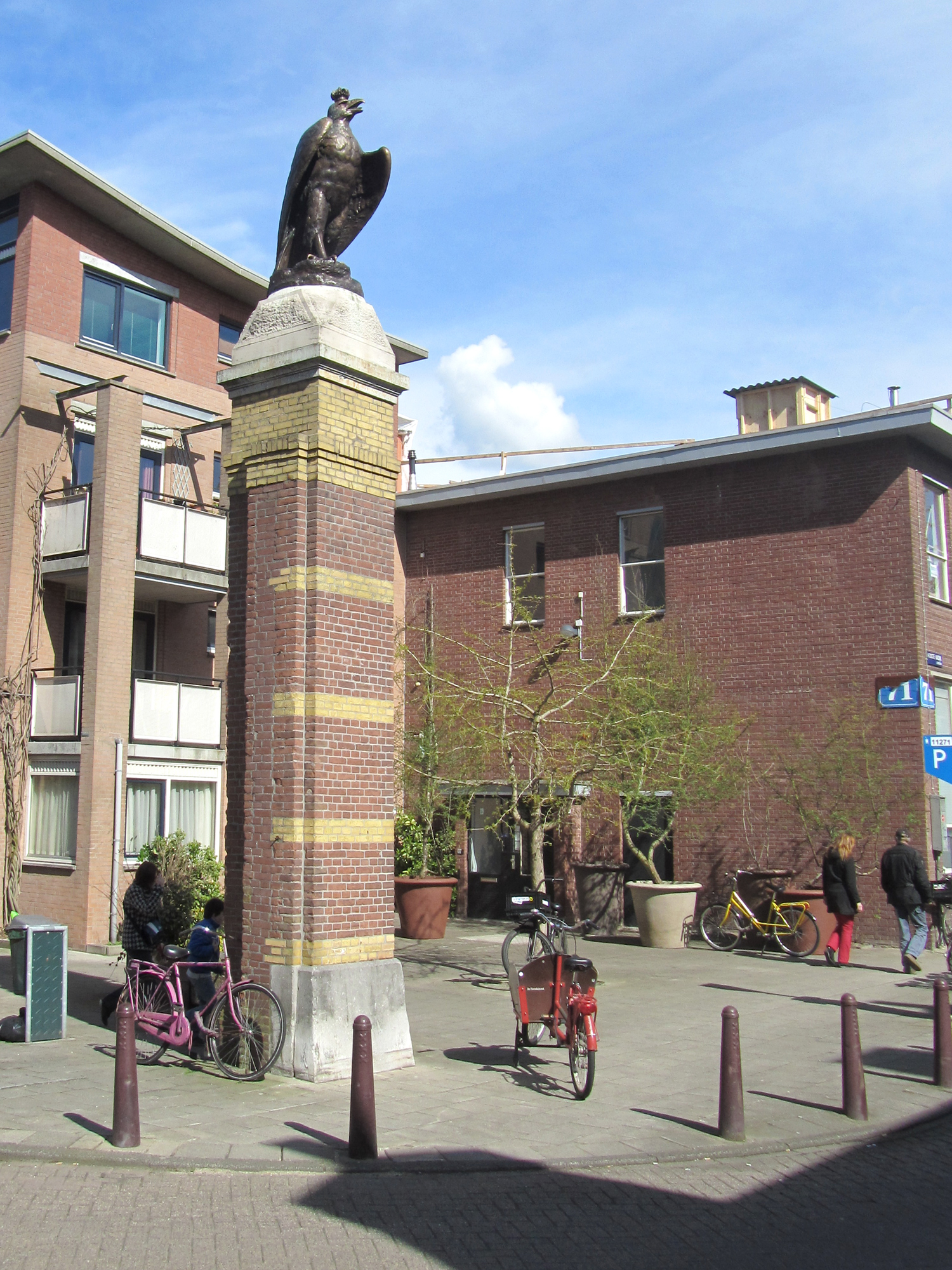
Pillar with replica of De Gekroonde Valk ("The Crowned Falcon"), Hoogte Kadijk
