= Entrepotdok =

Canal in Amsterdam

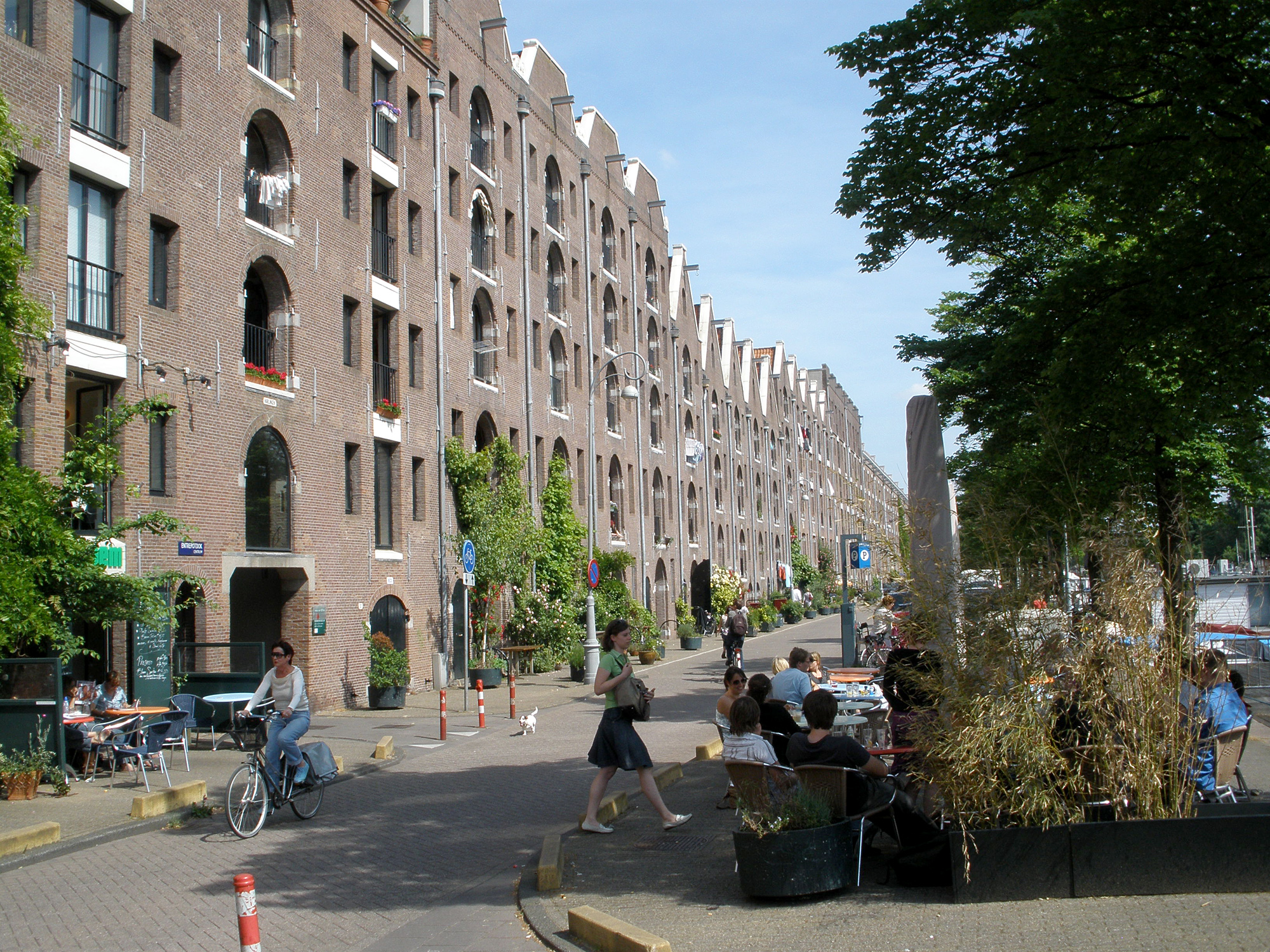
- Entrepotdok seen from the hippopotamus bridge

- Location in Plantage (outlined in red)
- Location: Amsterdam
- Postal code: 1018
- Coordinates: 52.368056°N 4.915556°E
- Northwest end: Kadijksplein
- To: Sarphatistraat

Construction
- Inauguration: 1827

The Entrepotdok (Warehouse Dock), formerly Nieuwe Rapenburgergracht, is a canal in Amsterdam, and a street and row of former warehouses with the same name along the northeast side of the canal. They were constructed between 1708 and 1829, used for storage, squatted in the 1990s and are now converted into apartments. Entrepotdok is the largest inhabited warehouse complex in Amsterdam. The canal runs between the Kadijksplein and Sarphatistraat, and is parallel to Hoogte Kadijk, Laagte Kadijk, Plantage Doklaan and Natura Artis Magistra zoo.

== Location ==
The northwest end of the canal connects to the eastern end of the Nieuwe Herengracht canal. Halfway along its length the Entrepotdok is drained by the Entrepotdoksluis (a lock), which connects the center of the canal to the Nieuwe Vaart. The southeast end of the canal connects to the eastern end of the Plantage Muidergracht.

The center of the warehouse complex can be reached from the northeast by the Pelikaanbrug across the Nieuwe Vaart canal. From the southwest it is accessible to bicyclists and pedestrians through a bridge from Kadijken. The Nijlpaardenbrug (bridge no. 1907; drawbridge for bicycle and foot traffic from 1987) connects the south of Entrepotdok street with the Plantage Kerklaan and the Plantage Doklaan .

== History ==
=== Warehouses ===
The oldest warehouses of the complex were built after 1708. In 1827 the warehouses came into the possession of the state. During the French period in the Netherlands, import and export duties had to be paid for transit goods on the Amsterdam market .

When Amsterdam experienced a lot of competition in the following period, the Algemeen Rijksentrepot (General Government Warehouse) was set up here in 1827 to stimulate the transit trade. Until 1895, goods could be stored temporarily in this warehouse without having to pay import duties (a type of bonded warehouse). They only had to pay duty when the goods were put on the market. The complex was completely walled off for this reason. A wall was built on the Laagte Kadijk and a gatehouse was built on Kadijksplein. Warehouses were also added: the middle part of the warehouses came into use between 1830 and 1840.

The Entrepotdok has 84 monumental warehouses. They were built between 1708 and 1829. They gave the city of Amsterdam a storage space of up to 300,000m³, close to the center. Due to the establishment of the Rijksentrepot, the bridge over the Rapenburgergracht (now: Entrepotdok) and the connection between Korte Kerkstraat (now Tussen Kadijken) and Nieuwe Kerkstraat also disappeared.

The dock lost its function as a warehouse for undeclared goods around 1890 due to construction of the Nieuwe Entrepotdok on the Cruquiusweg, and the buildings were empty for a long time. The complex fell into the hands of the municipality. There were still a few companies on the lowest floors, but the complex was deteriorating rapidly and several warehouses were in poor condition. Much was demolished in the area, especially at Kattenburg, Wittenburg and Oostenburg, but the Entrepotdok was declared a national monument, and so was saved from demolition.

=== Conversion into apartments for social rental housing ===
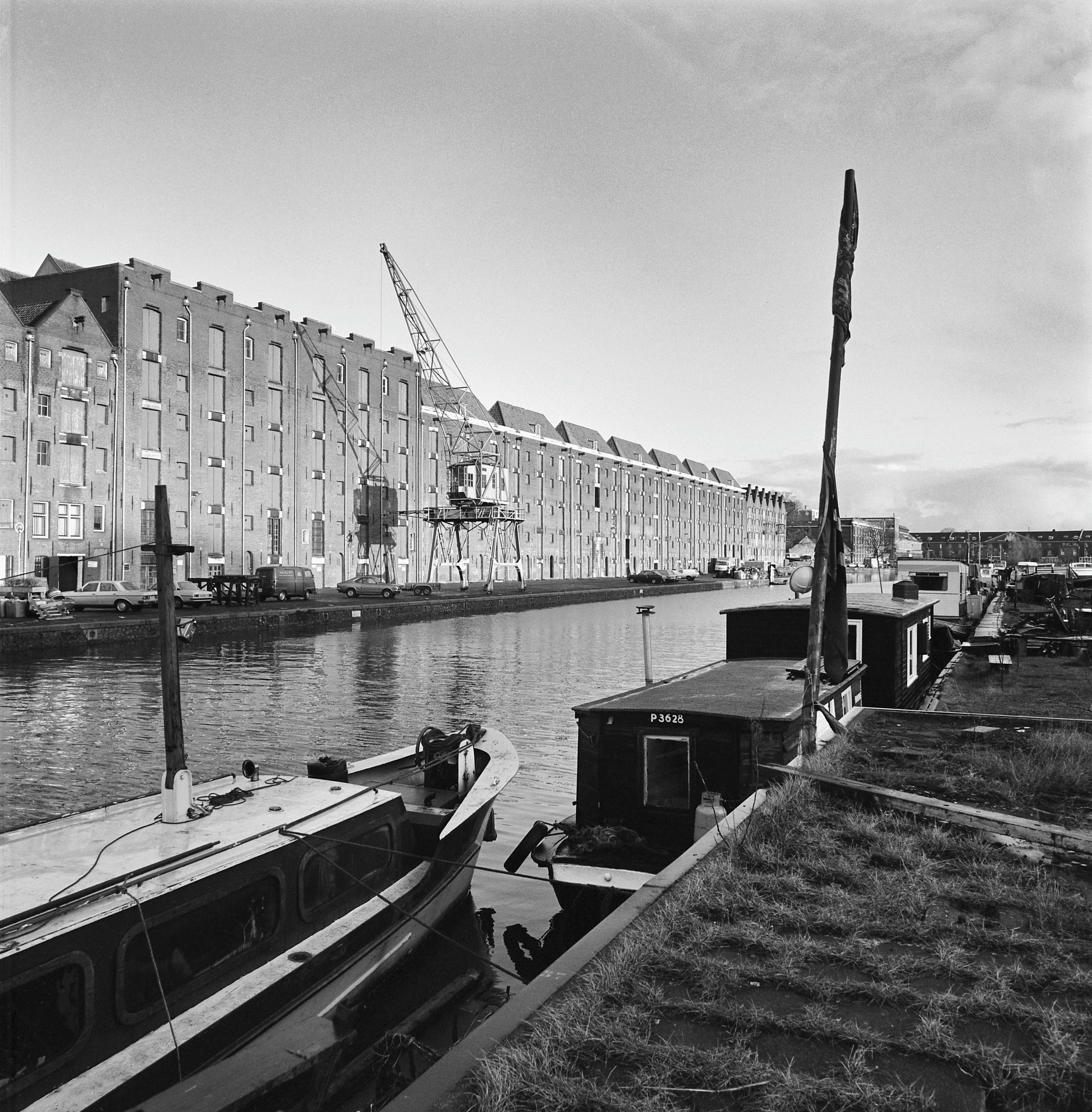
Warehouses in 1981 during conversion to apartments

After decades of financial tug-of-war, in the early 1980s, when Jan Schaefer was an alderman, a plan for reuse was developed by the municipality of Amsterdam (land company), the housing association De Dageraad and the architectural firm Van Stigt. Architect Joop van Stigt devised a plan to hollow out the interiors, so that in the very long, dark warehouse spaces, apartments could be situated around a communal central courtyard. This gives the houses enough sunlight. New business premises are situated on the ground floor and first floor. The cellars are used as storage, and after number 52 also as a parking garage and business premises. The first homes were delivered in 1984, in warehouses 79 through 84 (still from 1708) and in the last warehouse, number 13 (also from 1708) in 1989. Unlike any other social housing, the residents could participate in decisions about things like the design of the kitchen and bathroom. The inner courts have been given the street name Binnenkadijk. For the first homes, between 300 and 400 guilders were paid in 1984.

In 1984, the municipality offered the squatters in the Groote Keyser on the Keizersgracht apartments in the Entrepotdok and the squatters refused, since they considered it too far from the city center at that time.

After completing this huge social housing project in a prime location in the city, the warehouses on the former GEB site between the Entrepotdoksluis and the Geschutswerf road to the southeast have been converted into apartments for sale in the private sector. The 'Kalenderpanden' (calendar buildings) were named after the months of the year and were squatted in the late 1990s. The municipality refused to negotiate a solution and evicted the buildings in late 2000. The squatters resisted the eviction with burning barricades, having looted two nearby construction sites. Fifteen police officers were injured and eighteen people were arrested. At a farewell party the night before, the writer Geert Mak had lamented that Amsterdam was becoming a place for only yuppies and the elderly. The buildings had become a symbolic point of struggle over the future of Amsterdam.

The architectural firm Claus and Kaan created 42 homes here in the 12 buildings. An apartment cost more than €800,000 in 2007. Since 2001, the Aquartis apartment building has been designed by Liesbeth van der Pol on the site of the former power station on the east side of the Entrepot dock. A piece of retaining wall from the original coal storage became part of the new building here.

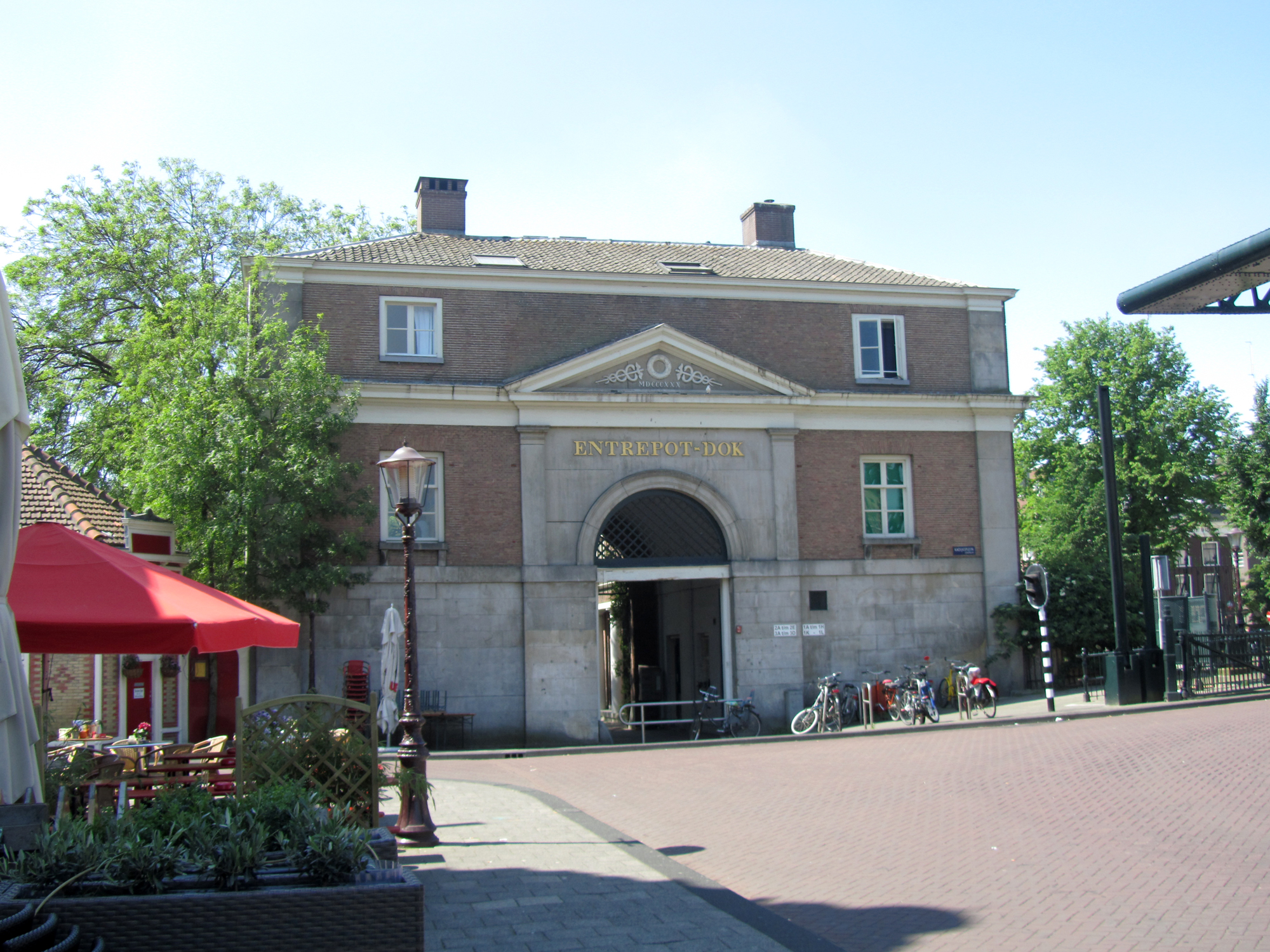
Poortgebouw on the Kadijksplein, next to the bridge over the Nieuwe Herengracht

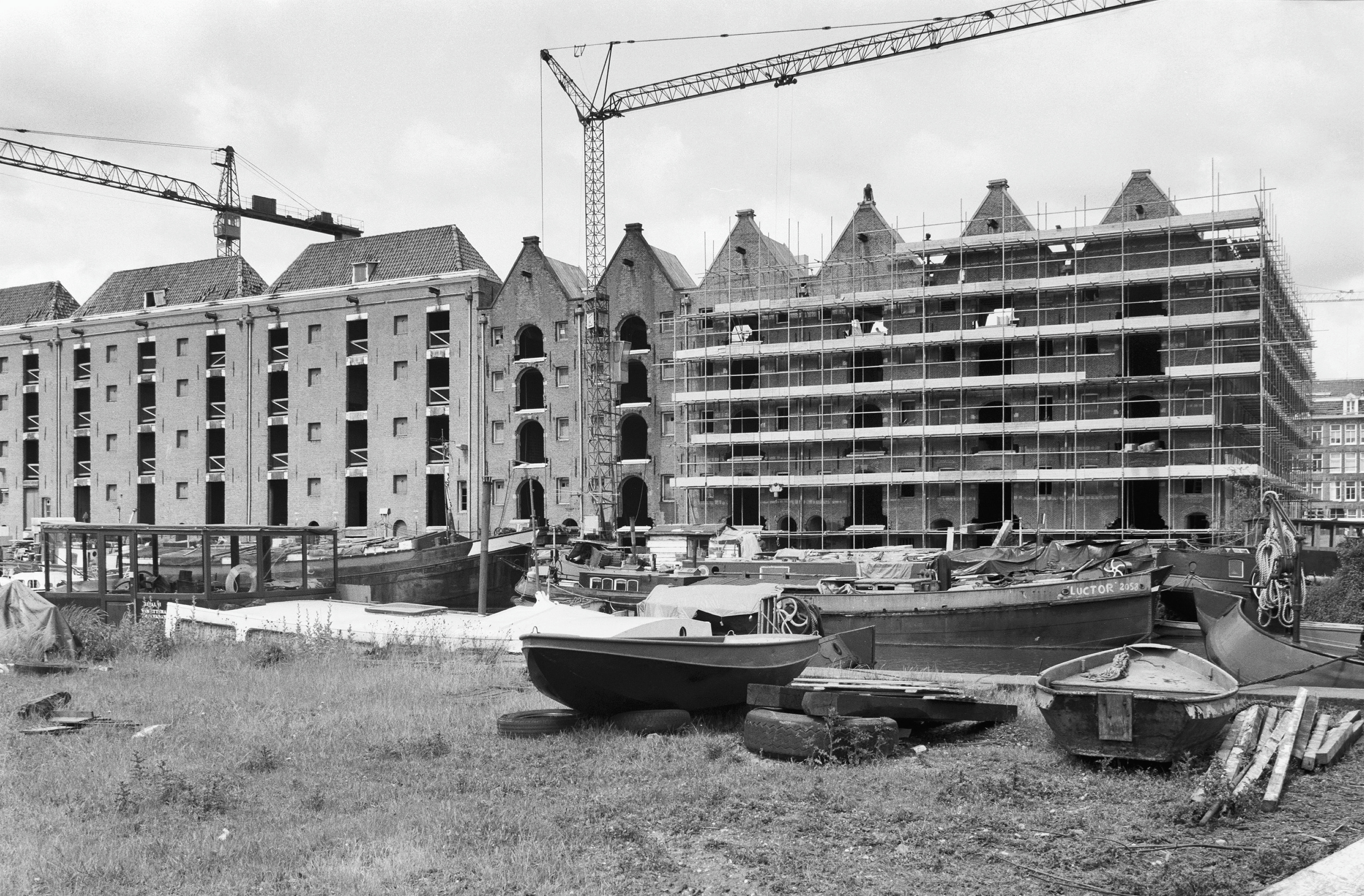
Renovation of the complex in 1983; on the right the oldest part of the complex (from 1708), on the left the warehouses built between 1830 and 1840.

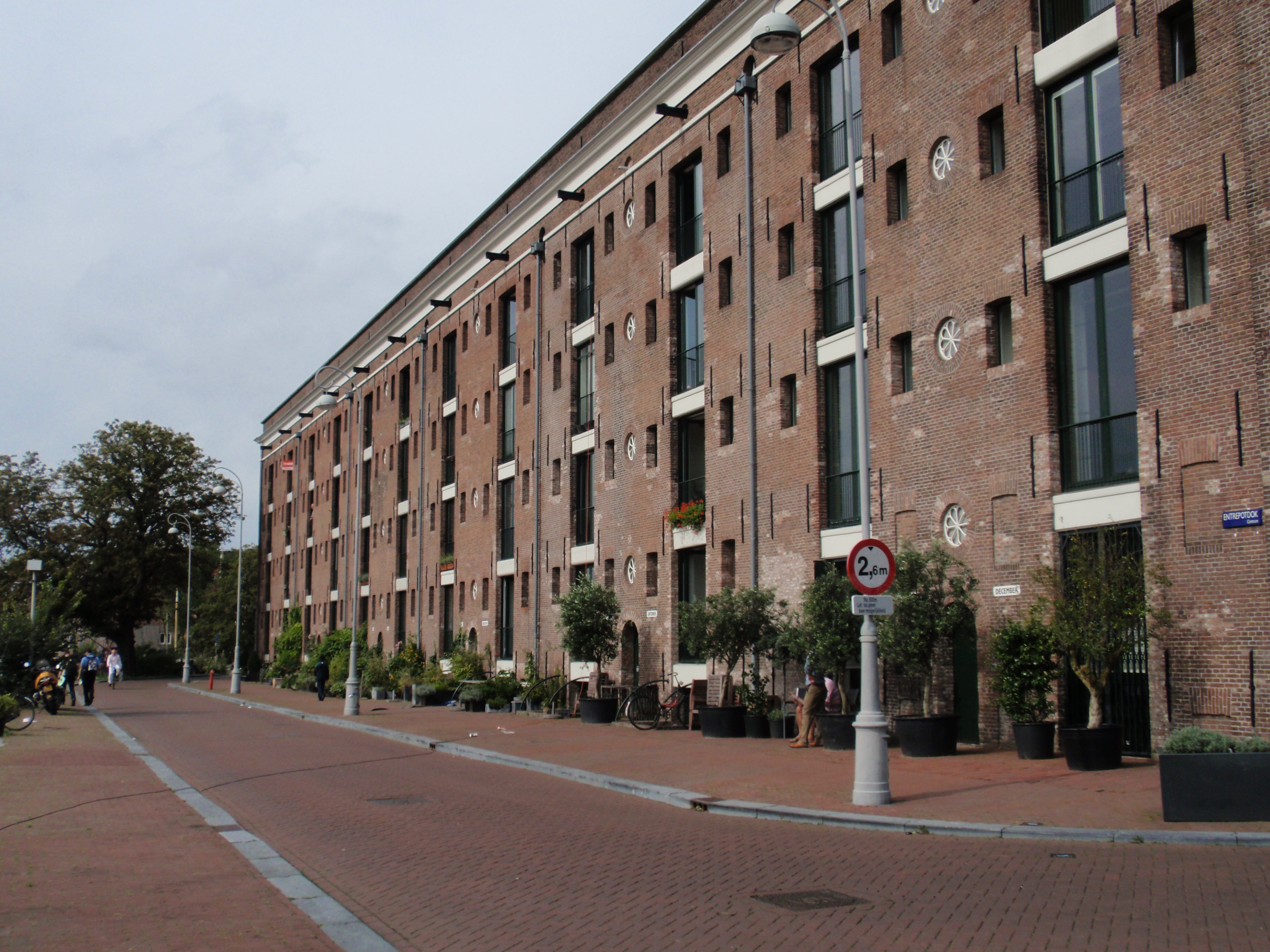
Calendar buildings, warehouses named after the months on vm GEB terrain.

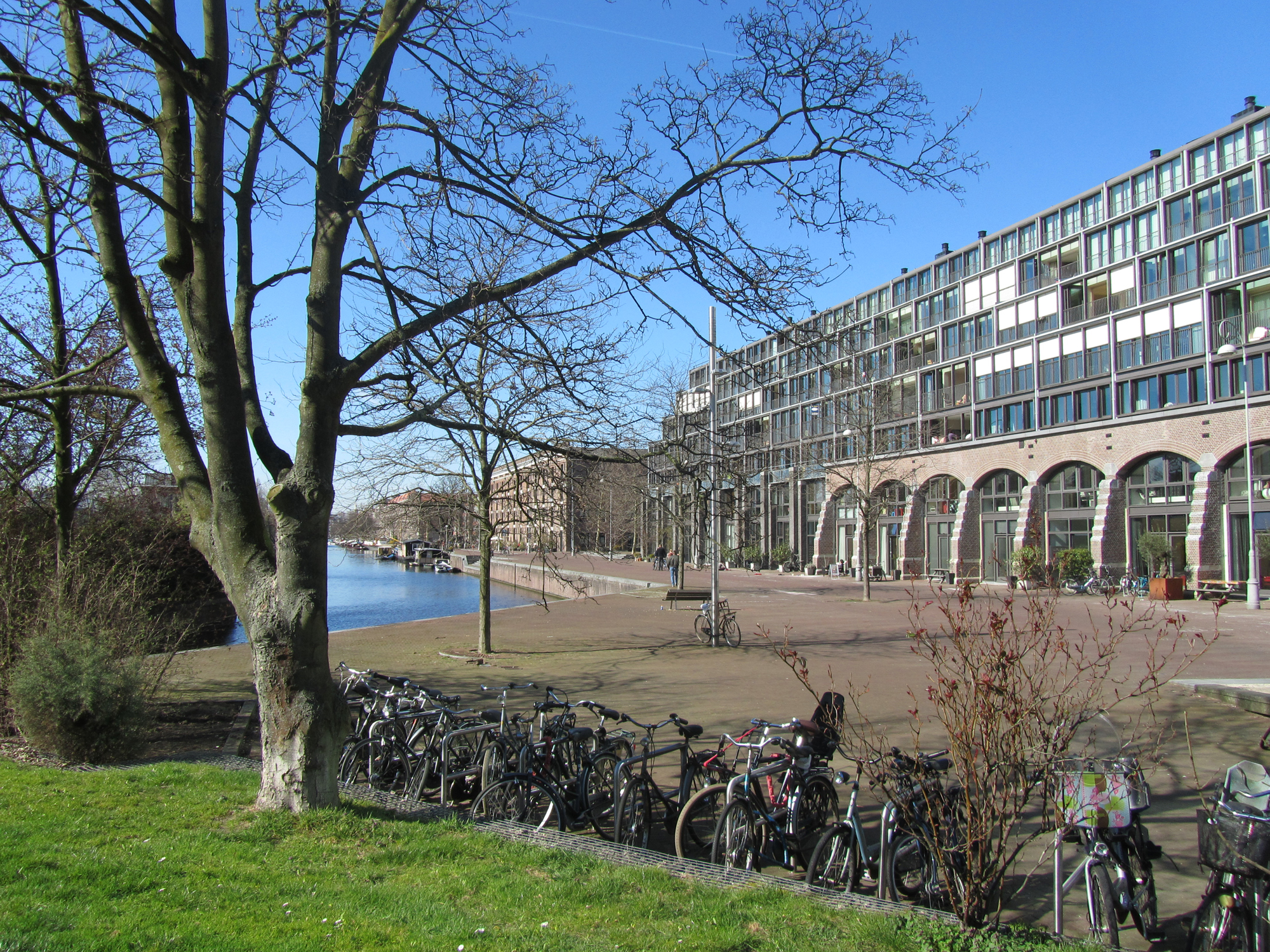
Entrepotdok seen from the Sarphatistraat

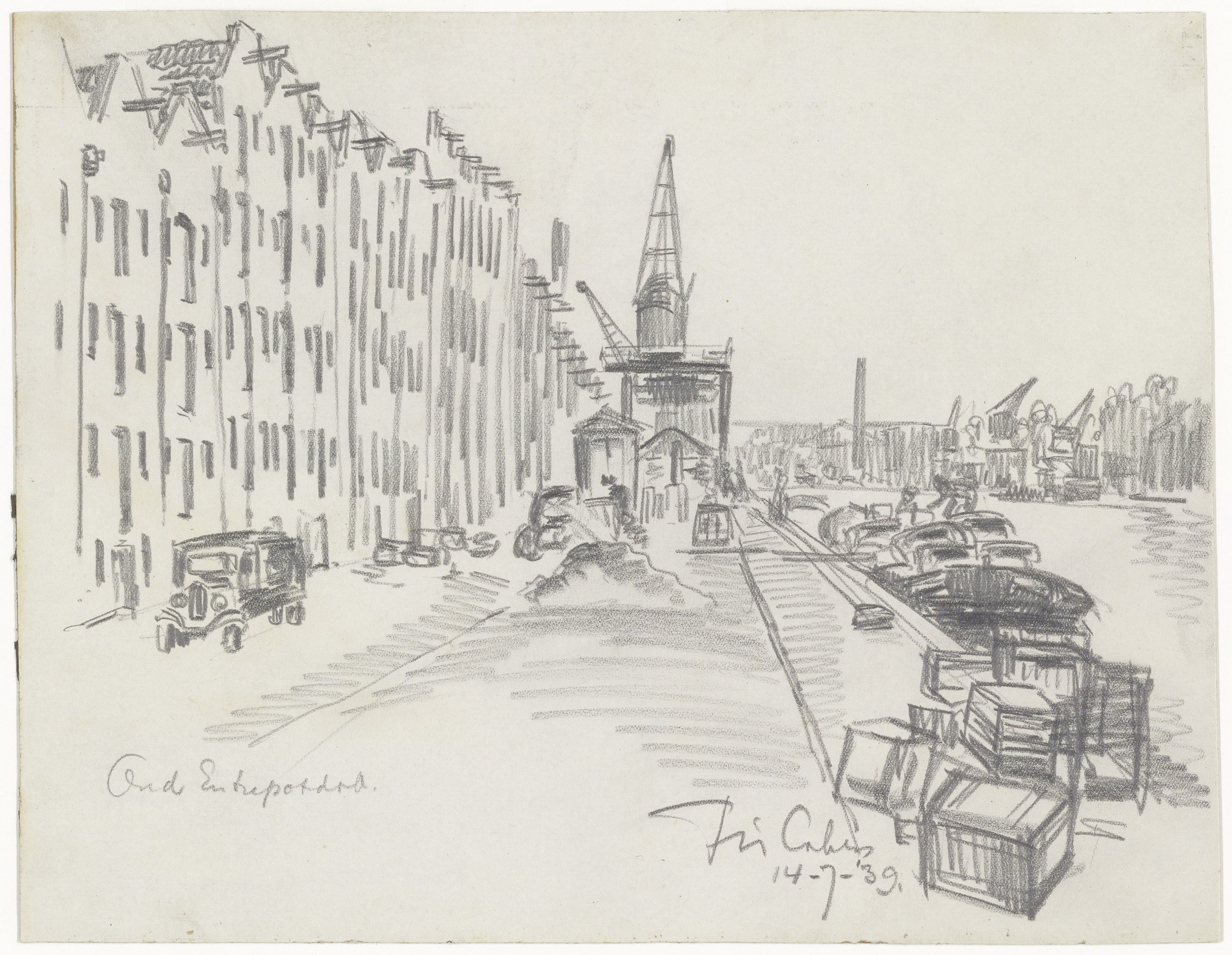
Drawing 'Old Entrepotdok' (14 July 1939) by Fré Cohen

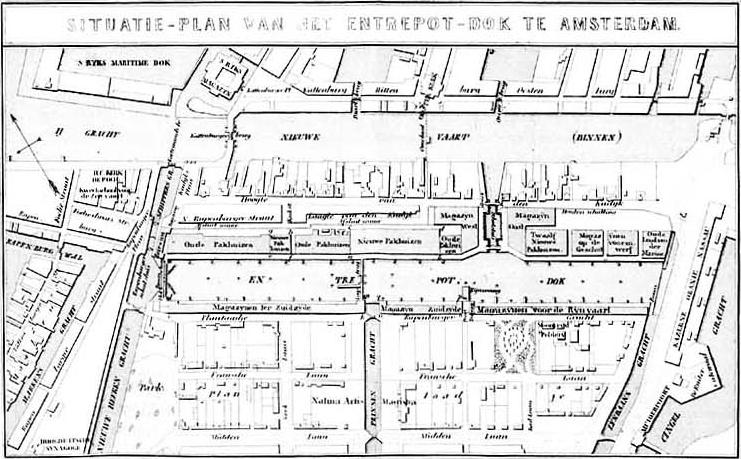
Map of the Entrepotdok from 1842

== See also ==
- Canals of Amsterdam
