= Plantage =

Coordinates: 52.365983°N 4.915159°E

- Neighbourhood of Amsterdam
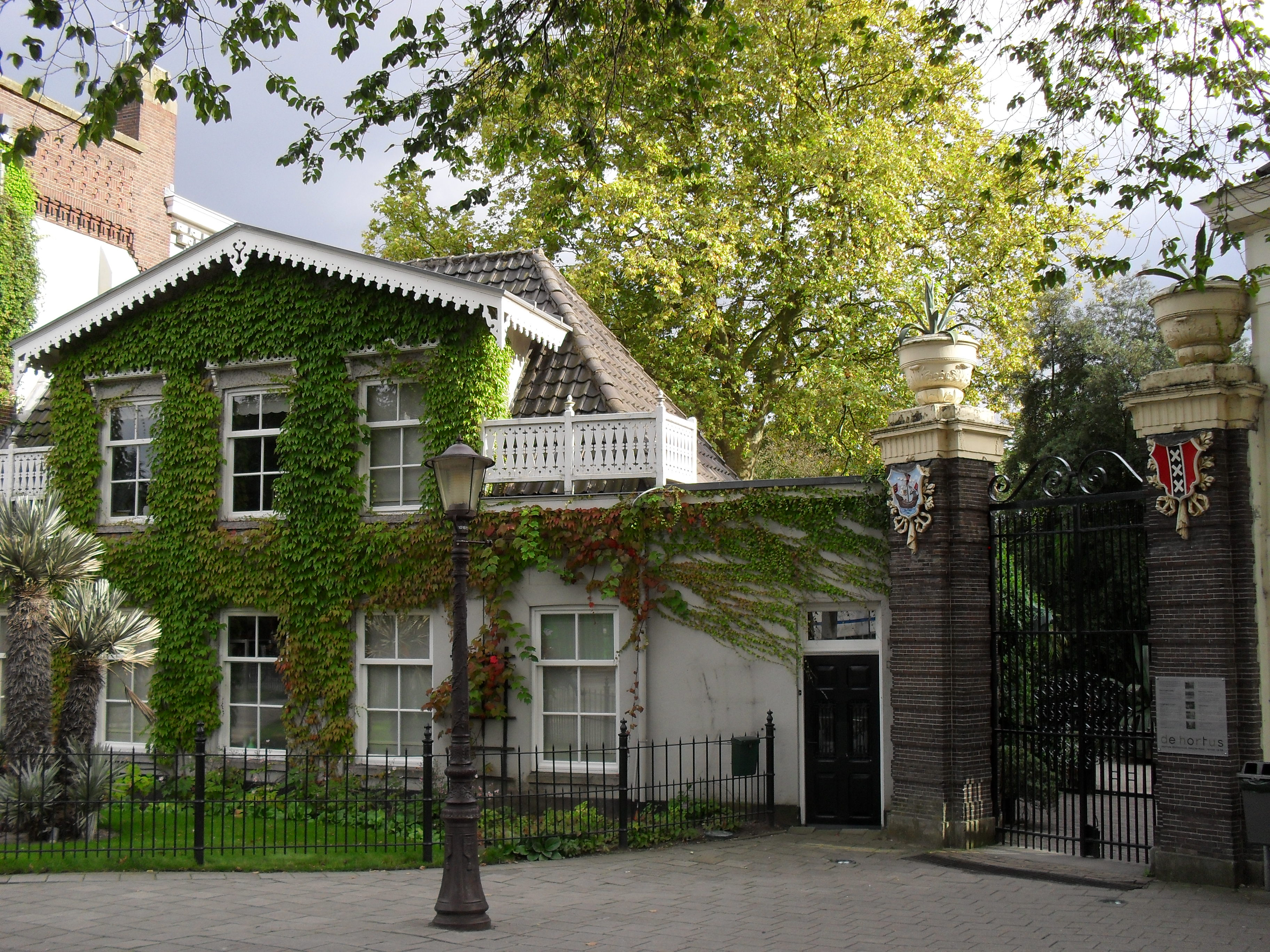
- Entrance of Hortus Botanicus in Plantage

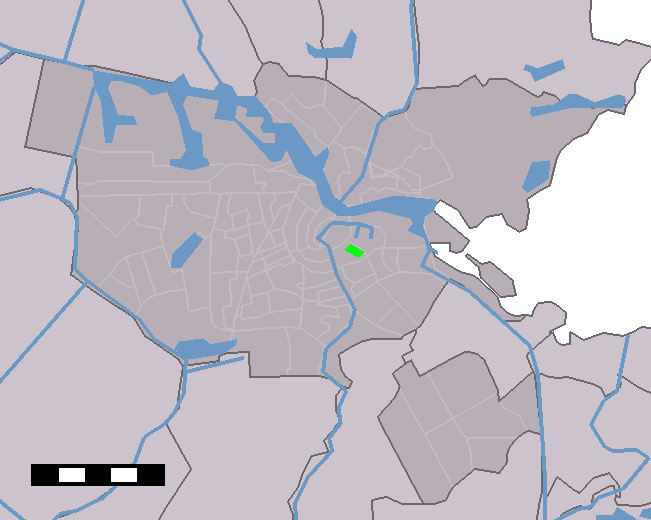
- Location of Plantage in Amsterdam
- Country: Netherlands
- Province: North Holland
- Municipality: Amsterdam
- Borough: Centrum

Area
  - Total: 0.15 sq mi (0.38 km^{2})

Population (2017)
  - Total: 1,980

Plantage is a neighbourhood of Amsterdam, Netherlands located in its Centrum borough. It is bordered by the Entrepotdok to the north, Plantage Muidergracht to the east and south and Nieuwe Herengracht to the west. In the centre of the neighbourhood lies the Natura Artis Magistra zoo. It had a population of 1,980 in 2017.

== History ==
=== Early years ===
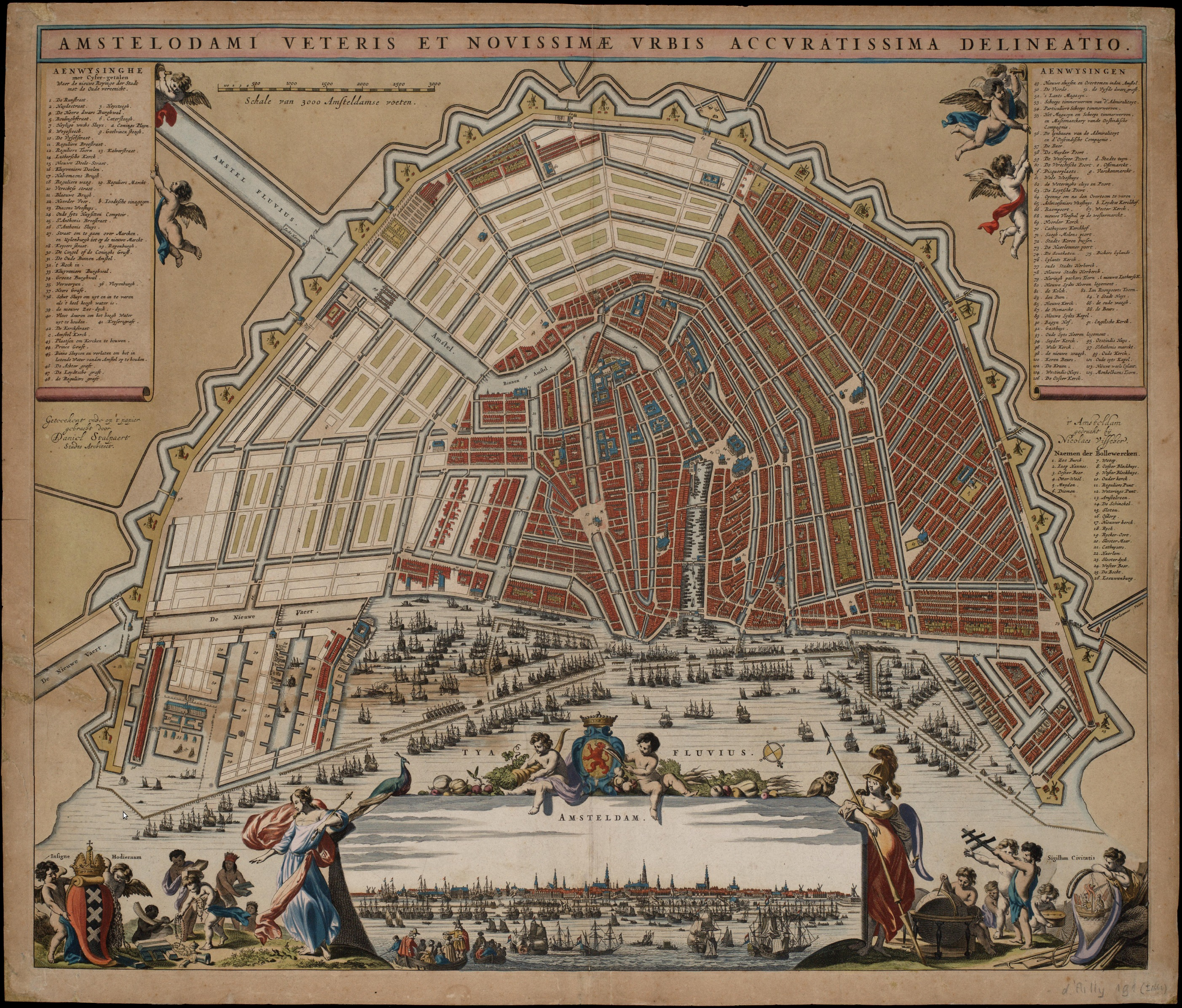
The initial design for the city's fourth expansion (Dutch: Vierde uitleg) by Daniël Stalpaert; Plantage is located on the left

The area came within Amsterdam city limits after the completion of the fourth large urban expansion of 1663. Due to an economic crisis caused by the Rampjaar events, the city government could not find enough buyers for the land. Construction in the area, which was then called Plantagie or Plantaadje, stagnated as a result. Instead, pleasure gardens and orchards were built where Amsterdam's citizens could go and relax in green surroundings.

The plots of land in the neighbourhood were leased by the city for a period of 20 years (with the possibility of a 10-year extension). This was because the city council intended to sell the parcels later on; permanent buildings were therefore not allowed. Temporary buildings were tolerated. In 1682, Hortus Botanicus, one of the oldest botanical gardens in the world, opened its doors across from the Wertheimpark, currently the only public park in the Centrum district of Amsterdam.

=== Artis zoo ===
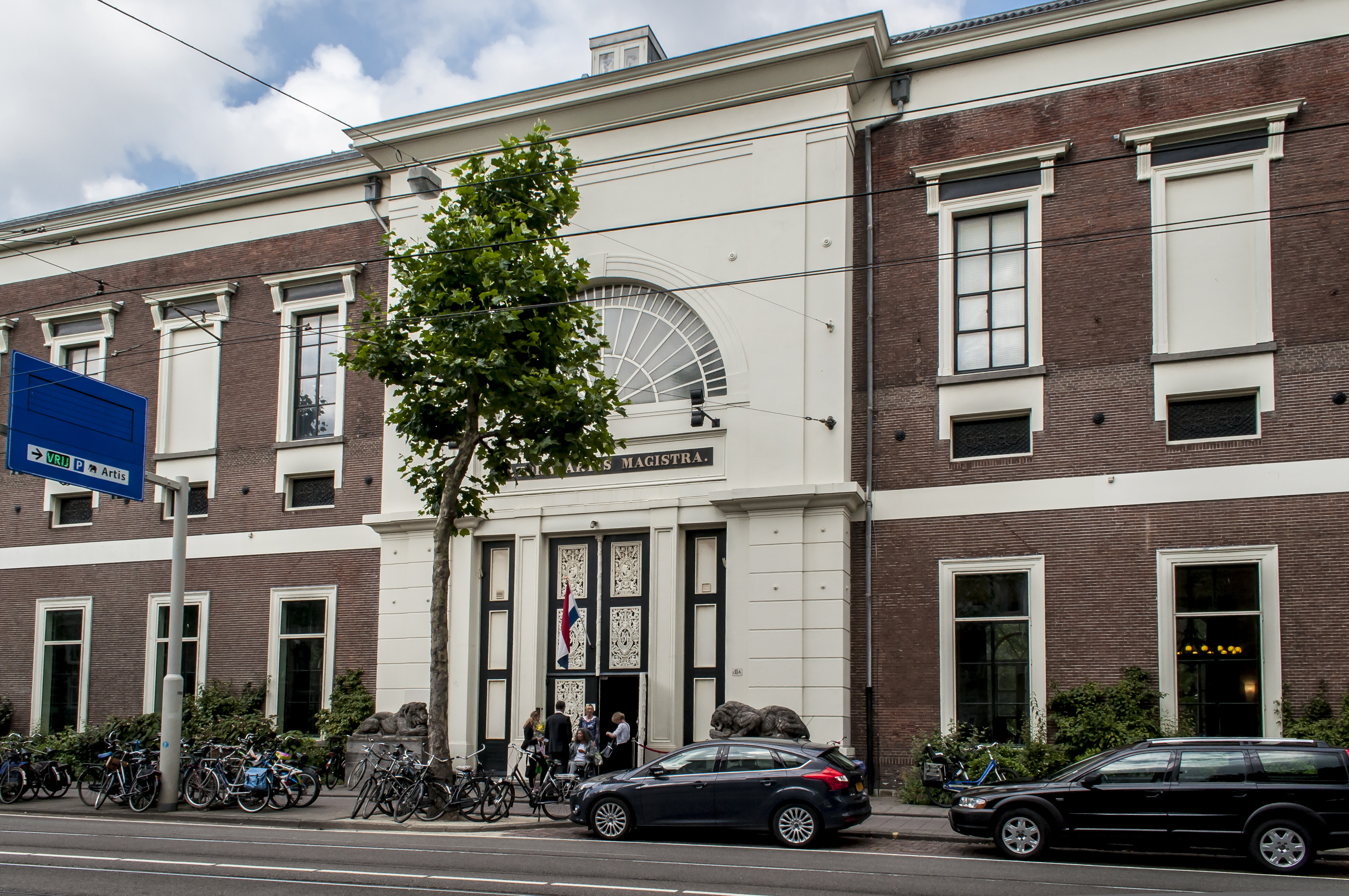
Artis zoo

The royal zoological society Natura Artis Magistra opened the Artis zoo in 1838, making it the oldest zoo in the Netherlands. Of the three main canals of the Grachtengordel, the Prinsengracht initially extended across the Plantage Muidergracht through Plantage towards Entrepotdok. Before it was filled in in 1866, this section of the canal ran through the centre of Artis, dividing it in two. The three ponds within the zoo complex are still reminders of this former part of the canal.

After 1860, the area became more urbanised and as such, Plantage was the only residential area within the Singelgracht that had large numbers of 19th-century buildings. Today, Plantage still has a much greener and more spacious character compared to other neighbourhoods of the old 17th-century city limits within the Singelgracht.

=== Theatres ===
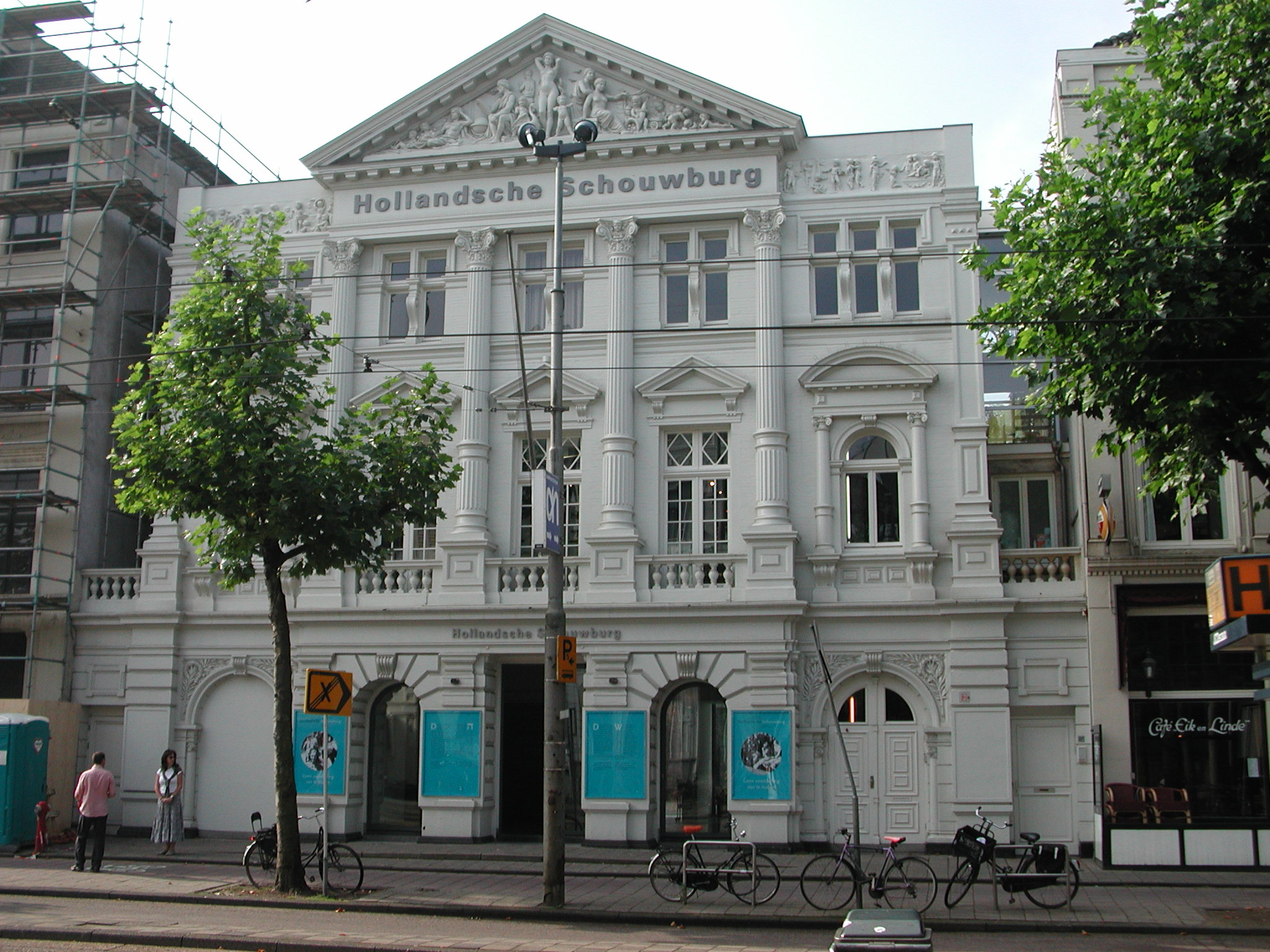
Hollandsche Schouwburg

In the 19th century, Plantage was an amusement district with entertainment venues and theatres. From 1880 to 1935, on the site of the current Plantage Westermanplantsoen, stood the circular Panoramagebouw (Panorama Building). From 1879, summer theatre Frascati stood at the site of the current Studio Desmet (formerly Rika Hoppertheater and Filmtheater Desmet). Between 1892 and 1911, the Wertheimpark was the location of the Parktheater. In the Plancius building (1876) on Plantage Kerklaan, Oefening Baart Kunst practised their performing arts. Artis Schouwburg, later called Hollandsche Schouwburg, famously premiered many plays by Herman Heijermans.

It was this building that, on 18 July 1942, became a deportation centre from which arrested Jews were deported to extermination camps during the Nazi occupation of the Netherlands; students of the nearby University of Amsterdam evacuated Jewish babies to the countryside under the direction of Johan van Hulst. After the war it became a memorial to the Jewish victims. Hollandsche Schouwburg is currently managed by the Jewish Historical Museum.

== Street names ==
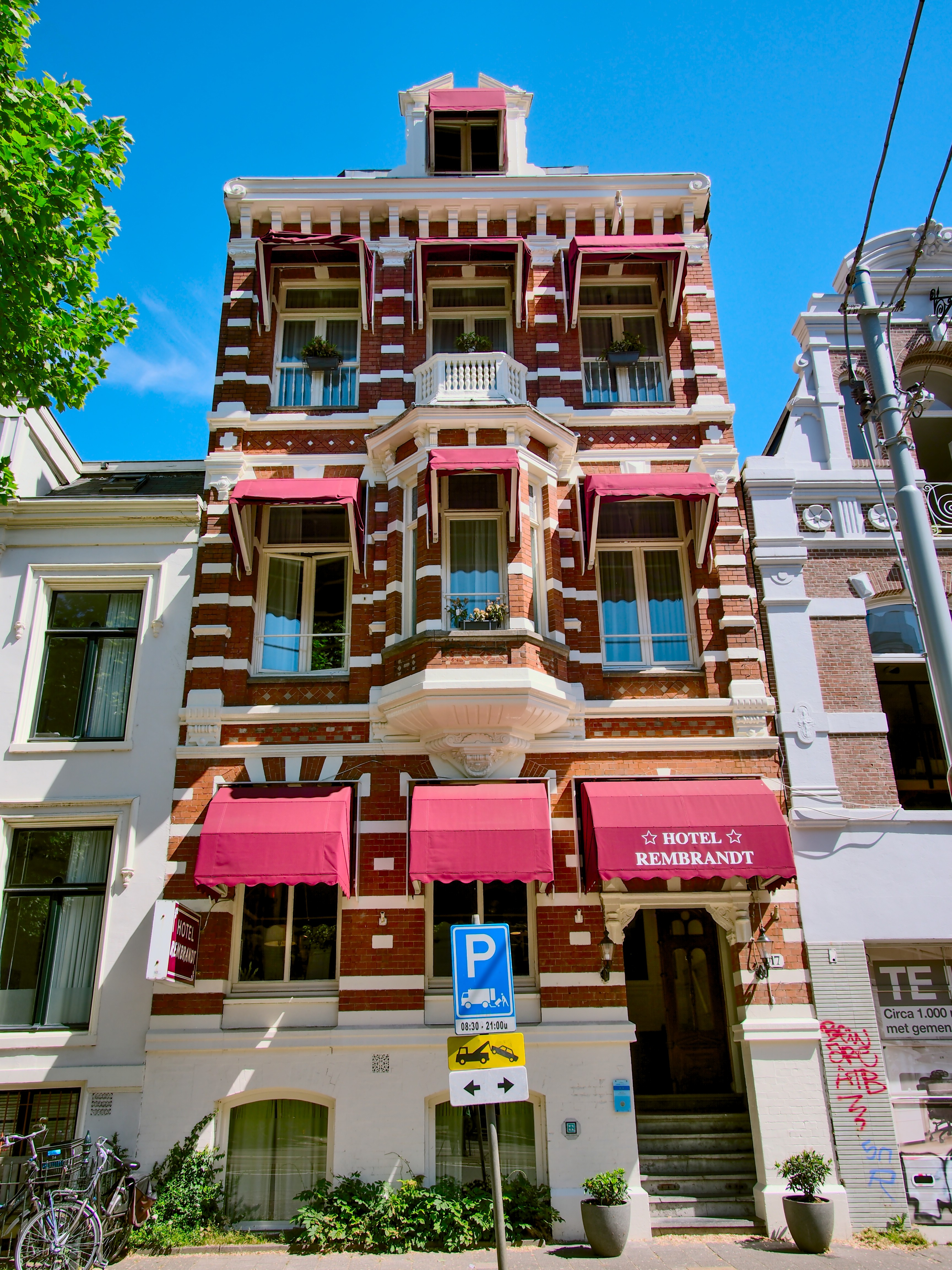
Hotel Rembrandt on the Plantage Middenlaan

Plantage's main road is called Plantage Middenlaan. Most other street names in the neighbourhood also start with the name Plantage: Plantage Parklaan, Plantage Kerklaan, Plantage Doklaan, Plantage Badlaan, Plantage Lepellaan, Plantage Muidergracht, Plantage Westermanlaan (formerly Plantage Prinsenlaan) and Plantagekade. The street formerly known as Plantage Franselaan is now called Henri Polaklaan, after Henri Polak, a trade unionist and politician.

== Listed buildings and architecture ==
- The Wertheimpark, with the Auschwitz Memorial.
- The whitewashed townhouses by G.W. Breuker, on Henri Polaklaan, Plantage Middenlaan, and Plantage Parklaan (1865).
- Hortus Botanicus (1682).
- Hollandsche Schouwburg (1893).
- The Groote Museum (Great Museum), with the King's Hall and Tiger Hall, at Artis zoo, Plantage Middenlaan 41a-43, by J. van Maurik (ca. 1855).
- The Library Building at Artis, by G.B. Salm (1868).
- Huize Welgelegen, a staff residence building at Artis (18th century).
- Huize Weltevreden (18th century).
- The Artis Aquarium Building, Plantage Middenlaan 53, by A. Salm and G.B. Salm (1882).
- The St. Jacob retirement home, Plantage Middenlaan 52 (1861).
- The Muiderpoort city gate (1770).
- Huis met de Vazen (house with the vases) on the corner of Plantage Middenlaan and Plantage Lepellaan (1874).

Modern developments:

- The Moederhuis (Mother House) by Aldo van Eyck, Plantage Middenlaan 33-35 (1978).
- The new developments of the St. Jacob's retirement home.

== Museums ==
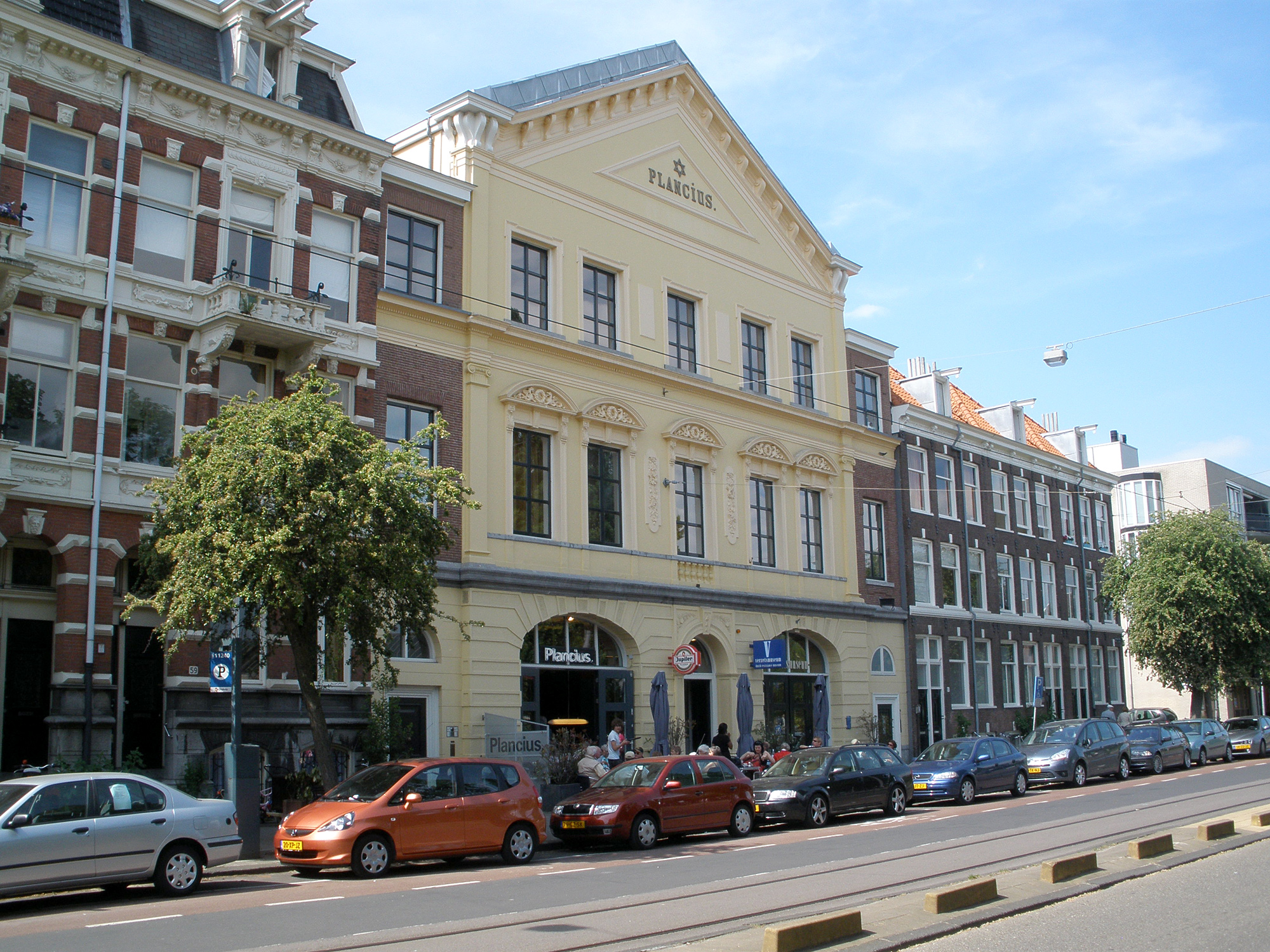
The Gebouw Plancius houses the Verzetsmuseum (Resistance Museum).

The Plantage neighbourhood includes museums such as:

- Jewish Historical Museum
- Hortus Botanicus
- Natura Artis Magistra
- Verzetsmuseum

Until 1910, the Ethnographic Museum was located in the Volharding building on the Artis complex. Until 2010 the building housed an exhibition space of the Zoological Museum Amsterdam at the aquarium building, along with a geological museum until 2011. In 2011 and 2012 the Amsterdam Tattoo Museum was also located in the Plantage area.

== Studios ==
- The former cinema Desmet, at Plantage Middenlaan 4, is now host to Desmet Studio, where TV and radio programmes are created and transmitted.
- In addition to Artis Zoo's main entrance, Studio Plantage, a TV studio, is also located in the building at Plantage Kerklaan 36.
