= Nieuwe Herengracht =

Canal in Amsterdam

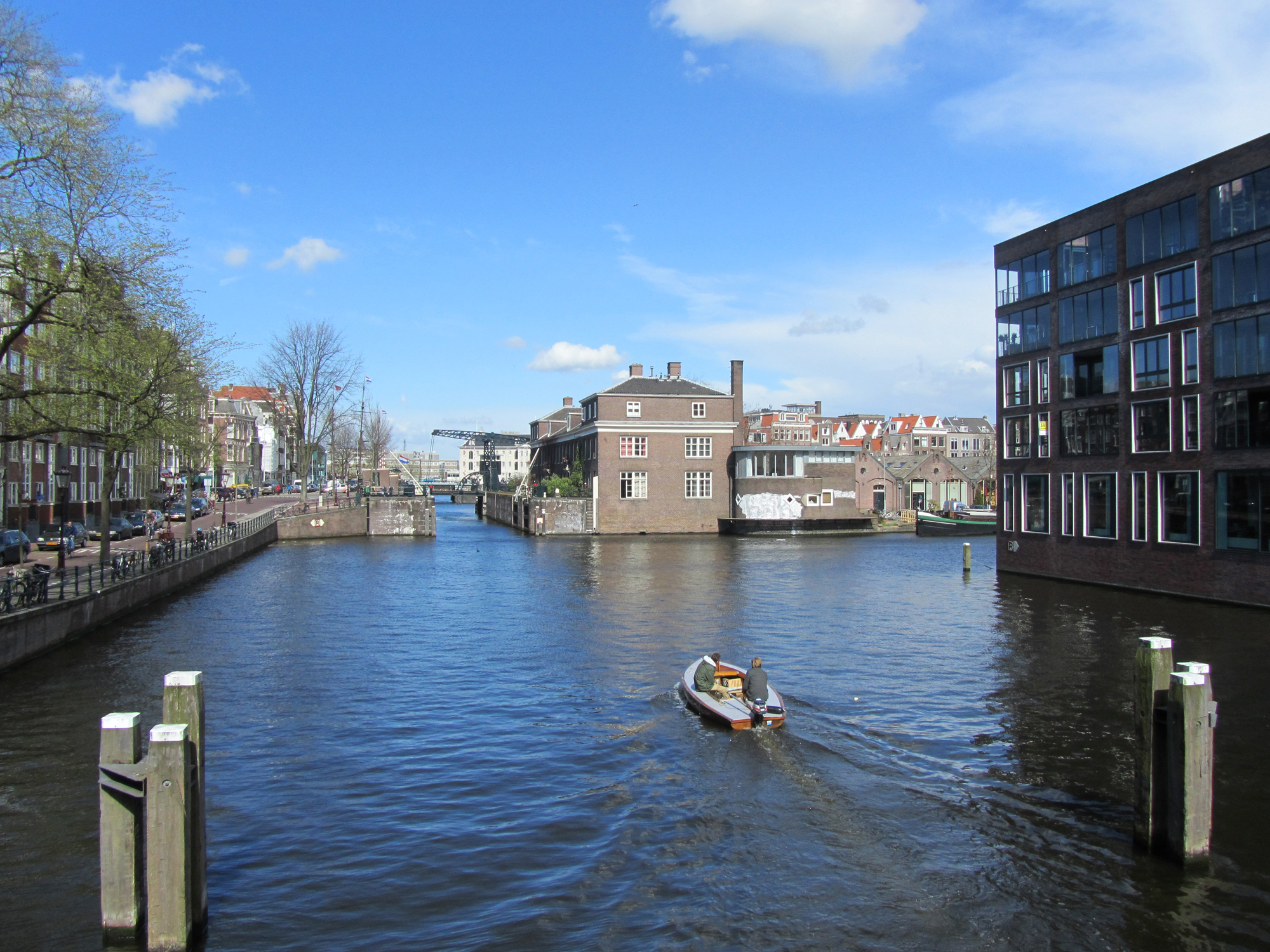
- Nieuwe Herengracht, looking at the Scharrebier lock. Right: the start of the Entrepotdok

- Location of the canal (dark blue)
- Location: Amsterdam
- Postal code: 1011, 1018
- Coordinates: 52.366894°N 4.906301°E
- West end: Amstel, opposite Herengracht
- To: Entrepotdok, Schippersgracht

The Nieuwe Herengracht (Dutch pronunciation: [ˌniu.ə ˈɦeːrə(ŋ)ˌɣrɑxt]) is a canal in Centrum district of Amsterdam. The canal is an extension of the Herengracht that runs between the Amstel and the Scharrebiersluis (lock) leading to the Schippersgracht from the Entrepotdok. It is in the Plantage neighborhood in the eastern part of the Grachtengordel (canal belt).

== History ==
The Herengracht, dug in 1612, is named after the Heren Regeerders who governed Amsterdam in the 16th and 17th centuries. The part between Leidsegracht and the Amstel belongs to the expansion of 1658. With the last expansion, the section was laid east of the Amstel to Schippersgracht, where the water flowed into the IJ, or since 1832 into the Oosterdok. This part, the Nieuwe Herengracht, like the Nieuwe Keizersgracht and the Nieuwe Prinsengracht, ran through the prosperous part of Amsterdam's Jewish quarter.

From 1874 the Nieuwe Herengracht has been part of the shipping connection between the Amstel and the Oosterdok and the IJ respectively. Before this the connection was via the Zwanenburgwal and the Oudeschans. The stone arch bridges were replaced by movable bridges for the shipping industry. These bridges are the Weesperzijde (bridge 237: Walter Süskindbrug), Weesperstraat (bridge 238: M.S. Vaz Diasbrug ), Muiderstraat (bridge 239: Hortusbrug) and bridge 50 in line with Plantage Doklaan. These were replaced by the current bridges in the 1960s and 1970s.

On the south bank, a cycle tunnel dives under the busy two-lane road of Weesperstraat, to connect the Amstel with the Plantage.

== Construction ==
Because the expansion of Amsterdam reduced demand for land, some building plots were donated to charities. For example, in 1682 the Hortus Botanicus Amsterdam, originally intended by the Amsterdam city council as a medicinal herb garden, was moved to the Nieuwe Herengracht. This botanical garden located on the bank of the Nieuwe Herengracht in the Hortus Bridge (bascule bridge 239) and Muiderstraat is one of the oldest botanical gardens in the world.

Around 1682, at the behest of the Diaconie of the Netherlands Reformed Congregations, the Amstelhof was built between Nieuwe Herengracht and Nieuwe Keizersgracht in monumental classical style as a home for the elderly in need. The construction was made possible by a bequest and the donation of the building land by the city administration. It remained in use as a nursing home until 2007. The complex has been radically renovated. In 2009, the H'ART Museum opened its doors here.

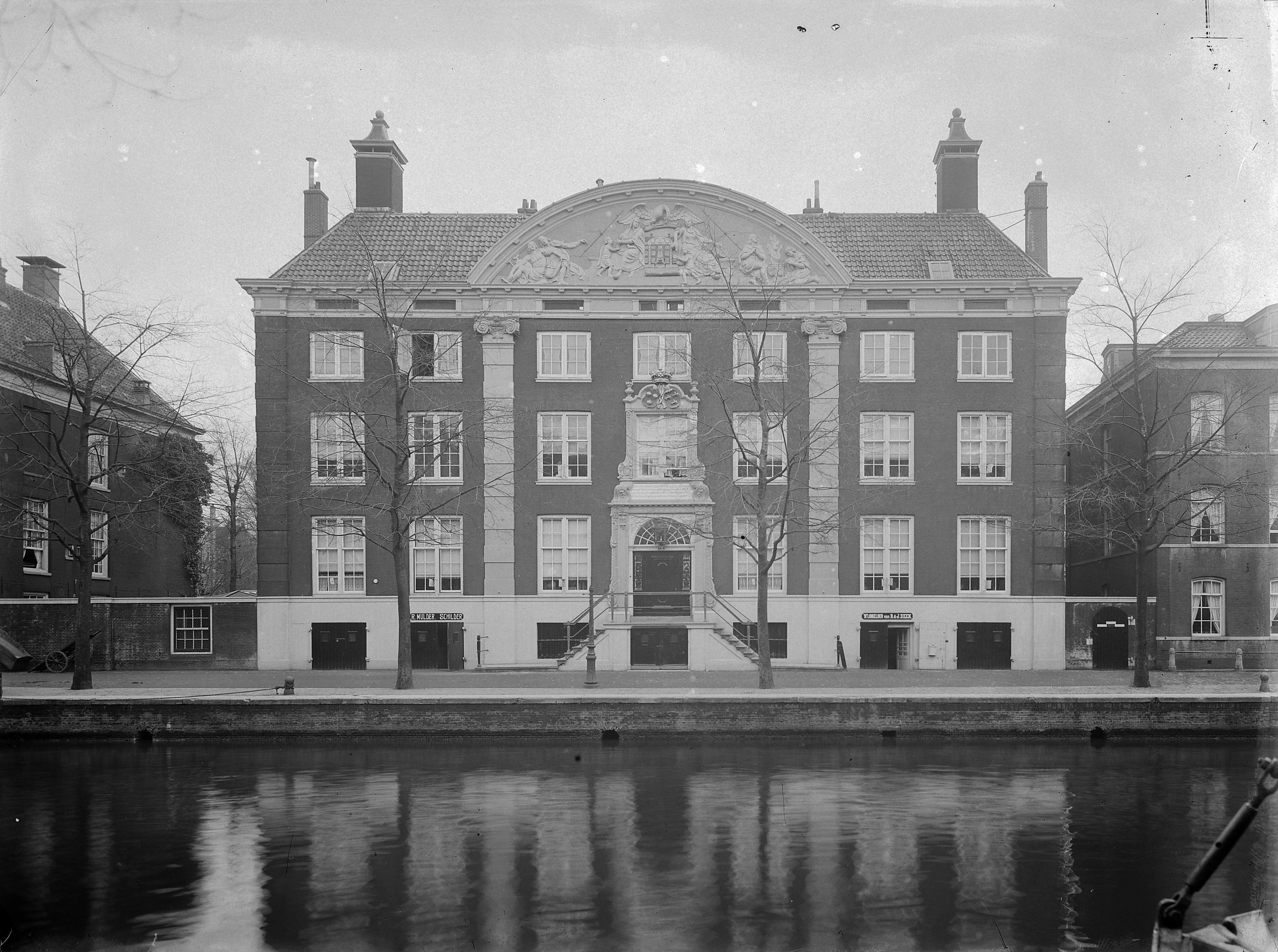
Corvershof facade on the Nieuwe Herengracht; around 1920

Behind the H'ART Museum on the Nieuwe Herengracht 18 and 20 are the 18th-century houses Het Corvershof and Amstelrank. The monumental buildings were also commissioned by the Diaconie to accommodate and care for the elderly and the sick. Like Van Limmikhof and Hodshonhof, which are located on Nieuwe Keizersgracht, they are part of the Amstelhoven complex, which used to include the building that now houses the H'ART Museum. They share the communal garden designed by Bureau Mien Ruys. Organizations related to the Protestant Diaconie Amsterdam are still located in the houses. Amstelrank offers accommodation to Het Wereldhuis, where refugees are assisted.

== Architecture and buildings ==
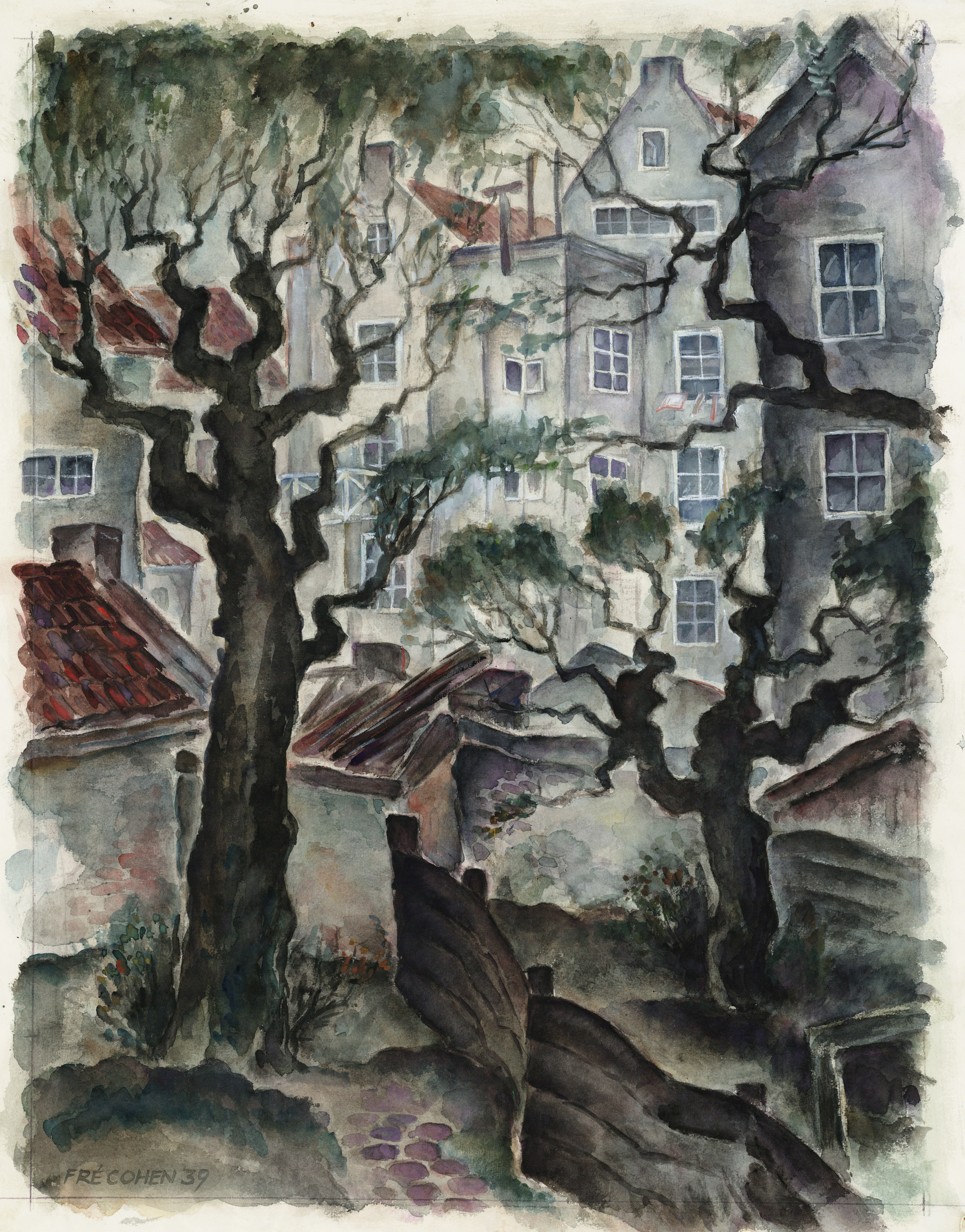
Rear of the Nieuwe Herengracht houses by Fré Cohen, 1939

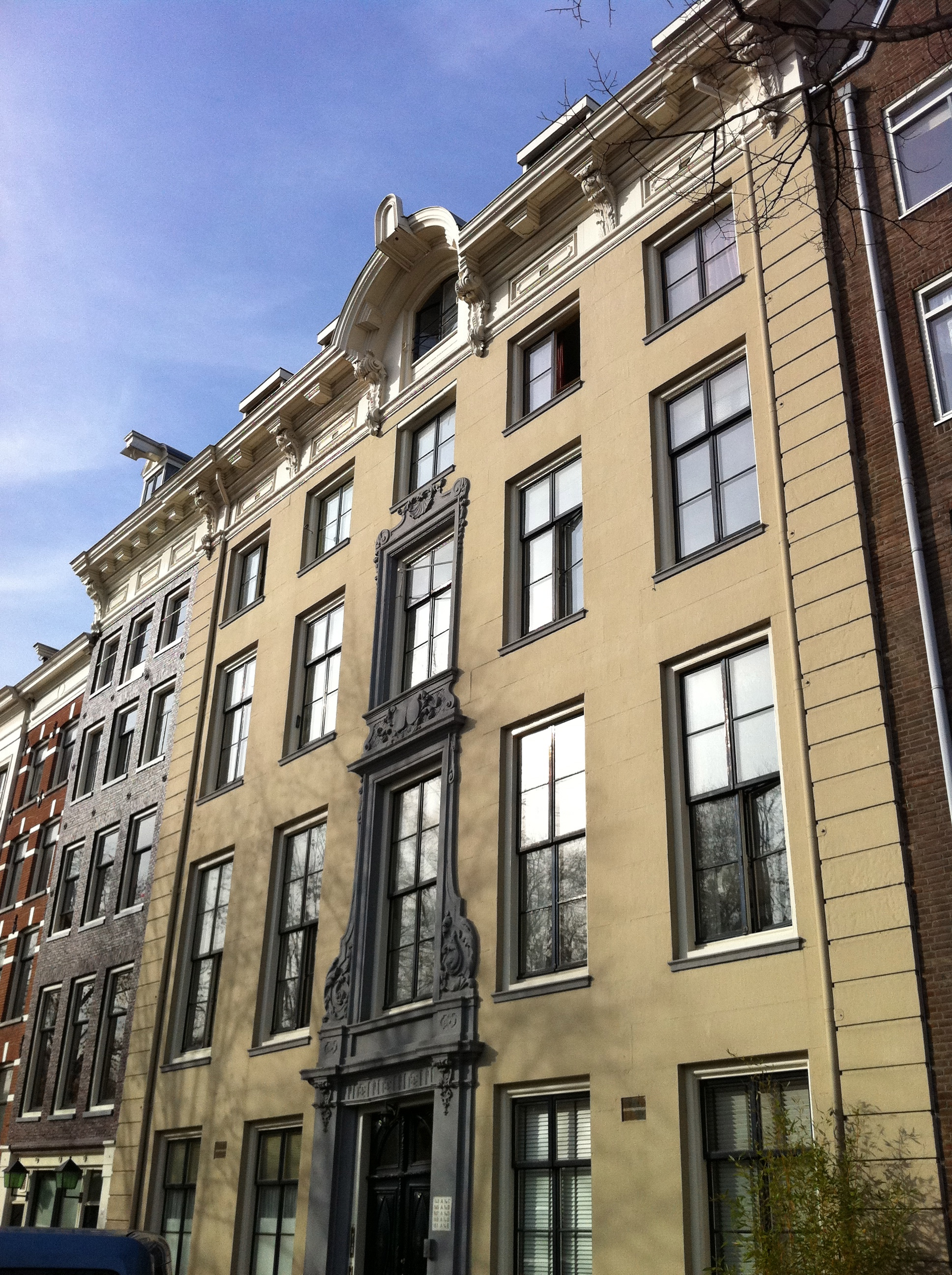
Canal houses from the 18th century along the Nieuwe Herengracht

- A typical example of a raised frame façade with a small semi-circular center elevation is found on Nieuwe Herengracht 99, completed in 1700. Jan Weenix painted five permanent paintings (wall hangings) for this house at the end of the 17th century. The client was Jacob H. de Granada, owner of a plantation in Suriname. Because of the large room at the front overlooking the Plantage, that house was popular with art lovers. The paintings were privately sold in 1923 to William Randolph Hearst for his Hearst Castle on the California coast. The canvases were subsequently spread over half the world.
- The only nude that the painter Jacob de Wit painted is from Nieuwe Herengracht 99. The panel was commissioned for the library of Isaac de Pinto and hangs in the Amsterdam Museum.
- The double house Nieuwe Herengracht 103, with a sandstone frame façade in Louis Quinze style, a door and window frame and a stylish frontal sidewalk and the rococo decorative fence. Aaron Joseph de Pinto, 1710–58, a rich Jewish merchant and art collector, bought the late 17th-century building in 1734 and had it thoroughly renovated in 1751 and fitted with a new (current) facade.
- The double house on Nieuwe Herengracht 143 from 1720 has a sandstone façade with checkered corner lesenes, sculpted middle engraving, with a raised straight frame with corbels in the middle.

== Famous residents ==
- Hendrik Gravé (1670–1749), Dutch admiral, lived at Nieuwe Herengracht 99.
- Aaron Joseph de Pinto (1710–1758), merchant and collector.
- Isaac de Pinto (1717–1787), governor of the Dutch East India Company (VOC) and philosopher.
- Willem Sautijn (1704–1789).
- Jan van Mekeren, rich Amsterdam wood buyer and benefactor.
- Samuel Wiselius (1769–1845), patriot, received 99 Nieuwe Herengracht from Gustav IV Adolf of Sweden.
- Jonas Daniel Meijer (1780–1834), first Jewish lawyer in the Batavian Republic to be admitted to the bar, lived at Nieuwe Herengracht 103.
- Isaac Gosschalk (1838–1907), architect, born on Nieuwe Herengracht.
- Frederic Joseph Maria Anton Reekers (1842–1922), Catholic politician.
- Willem Hovy, owner of De Gekroonde Valk beer brewery, lived at the end of the 19th century on Nieuwe Herengracht 143 .
- David Wijnkoop (1876–1941), communist, lived at Nieuwe Herengracht 67 from 1907 to 1910 .
- Wim Ibo (1918–2000), comedian, writer and producer.
- Ben Sajet (1887–1986), socially engaged doctor and social-democratic Amsterdam city council member and member of the States of North Holland.

== See also ==
- Canals of Amsterdam
