= Schippersgracht =

Canal in Amsterdam

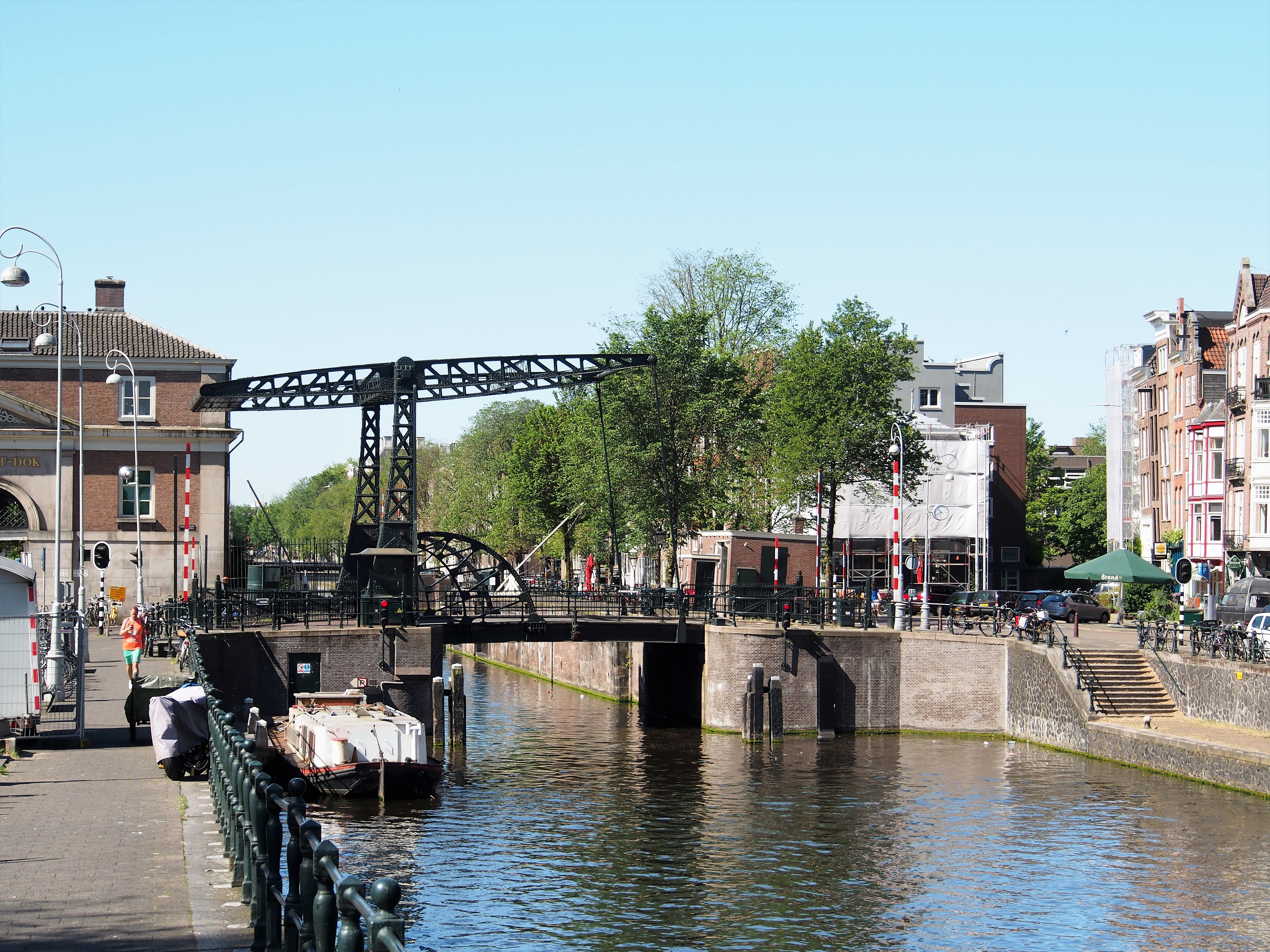
- Schippersgracht with the Scharrebier lock

- Location within Amsterdam
- Length: 100 metres (330 ft)
- Location: Amsterdam
- Postal code: 1016
- Coordinates: 52.370643°N 4.912141°E
- East end: Rapenburgerplein
- To: Prins Hendrikkade

The Schippersgracht (Dutch pronunciation: [ˈsxɪpərsˌxrɑxt]) is a canal and street in the Centrum district of Amsterdam that runs from the Rapenburgerplein to the Prins Hendrikkade.

== Location ==
The Schippersgracht street starts where Foeliedwarsstraat crosses Rapenburgerplein and ends at the Kortjewantsbrug (bridge 487) on Prins Hendrikkade. The Schippersgracht canal is an extension of the Nieuwe Herengracht leading to Nieuwe Vaart, and is about 100 metres (330 ft) long. The quay along the north-west side of the water has the house numbers 2 to 16, with even and odd numbers alternating (not opposite each other). In the past there were higher house numbers, up to 423. The current numbering began in the 19th century. The southeastern bank of the canal is called Kadijksplein. The Schippersgracht owes its name to the fact that many skippers lived here.

== Architecture ==
There are a number of monumental buildings from the 17th century on Schippersgracht, including numbers 14 and 15. The Amsterdam architect Herman Hendrik Baanders (1849–1905) designed Schippersgracht 5 (1897). Baanders was mainly active in Amsterdam.

== History ==
In April 1854 the Amsterdamsche Duinwater-Maatschappij started installation of drinking water on the Schippersgracht. Around 1906 the end of tram line 2 was on the Schippersgracht. This was canceled after six months and shortened to Central Station.

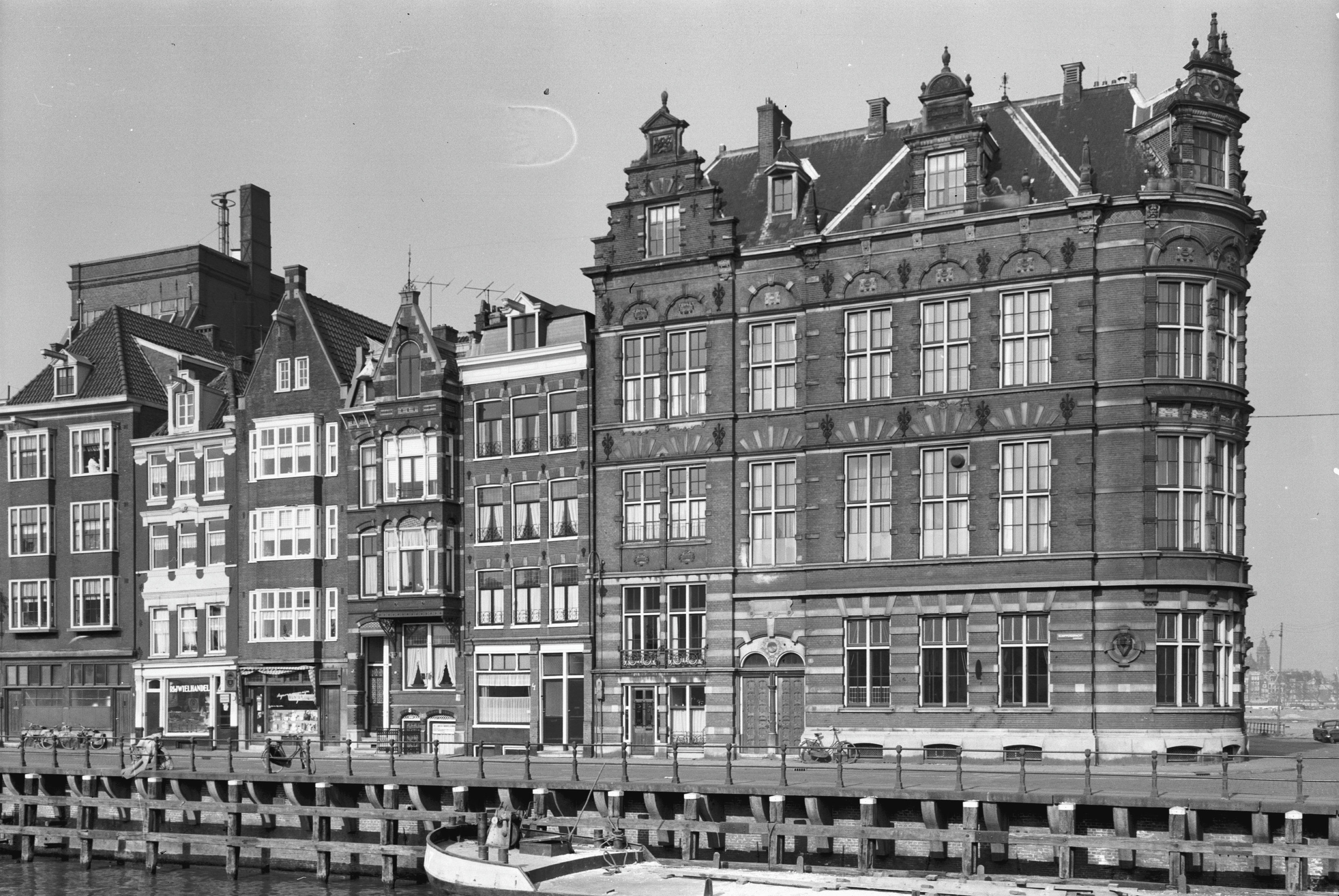
Schippersgracht, corner with Prins Hendrikkade

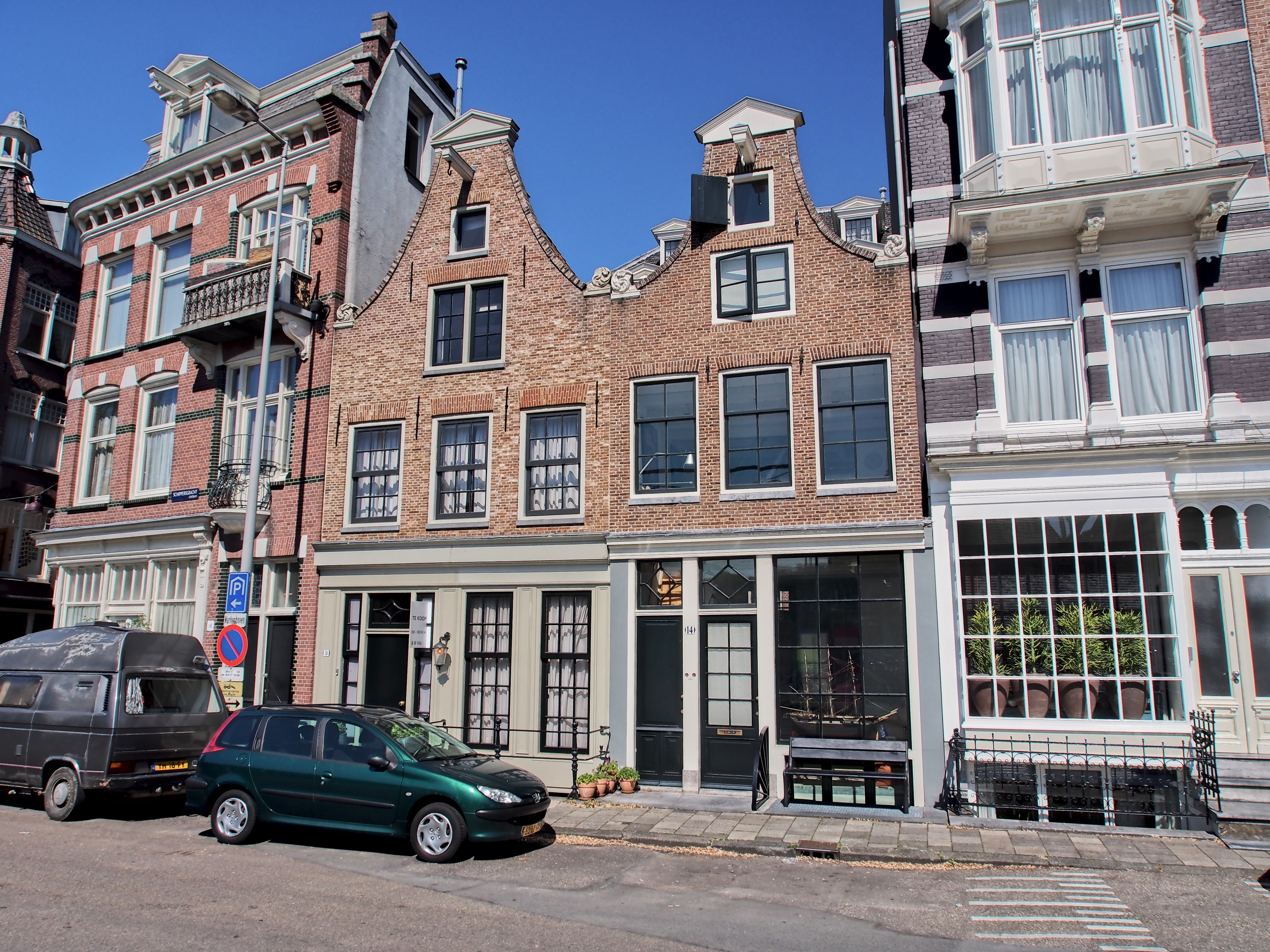
Schippersgracht 14-16

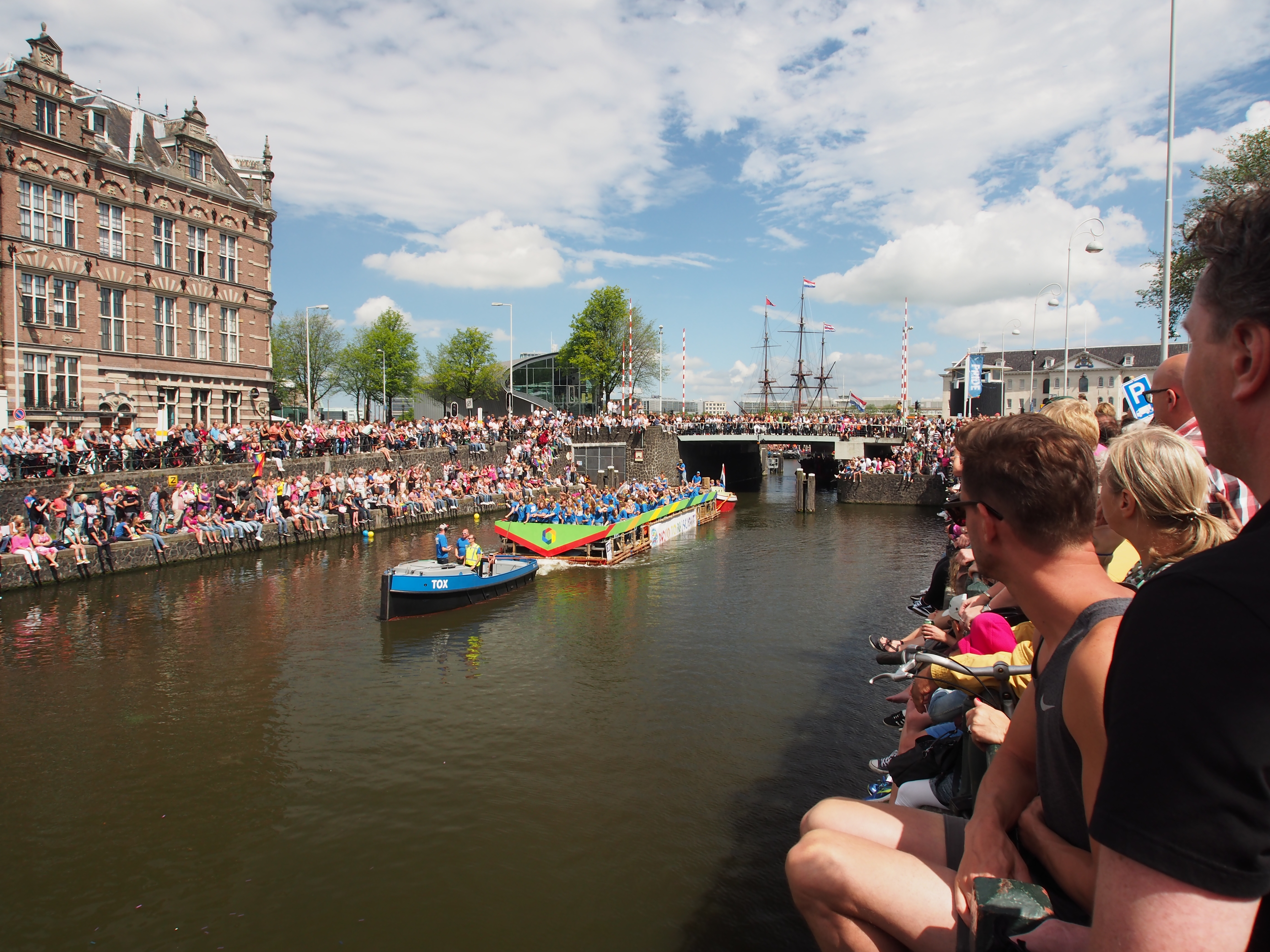
Amsterdam Canal Parade 2017

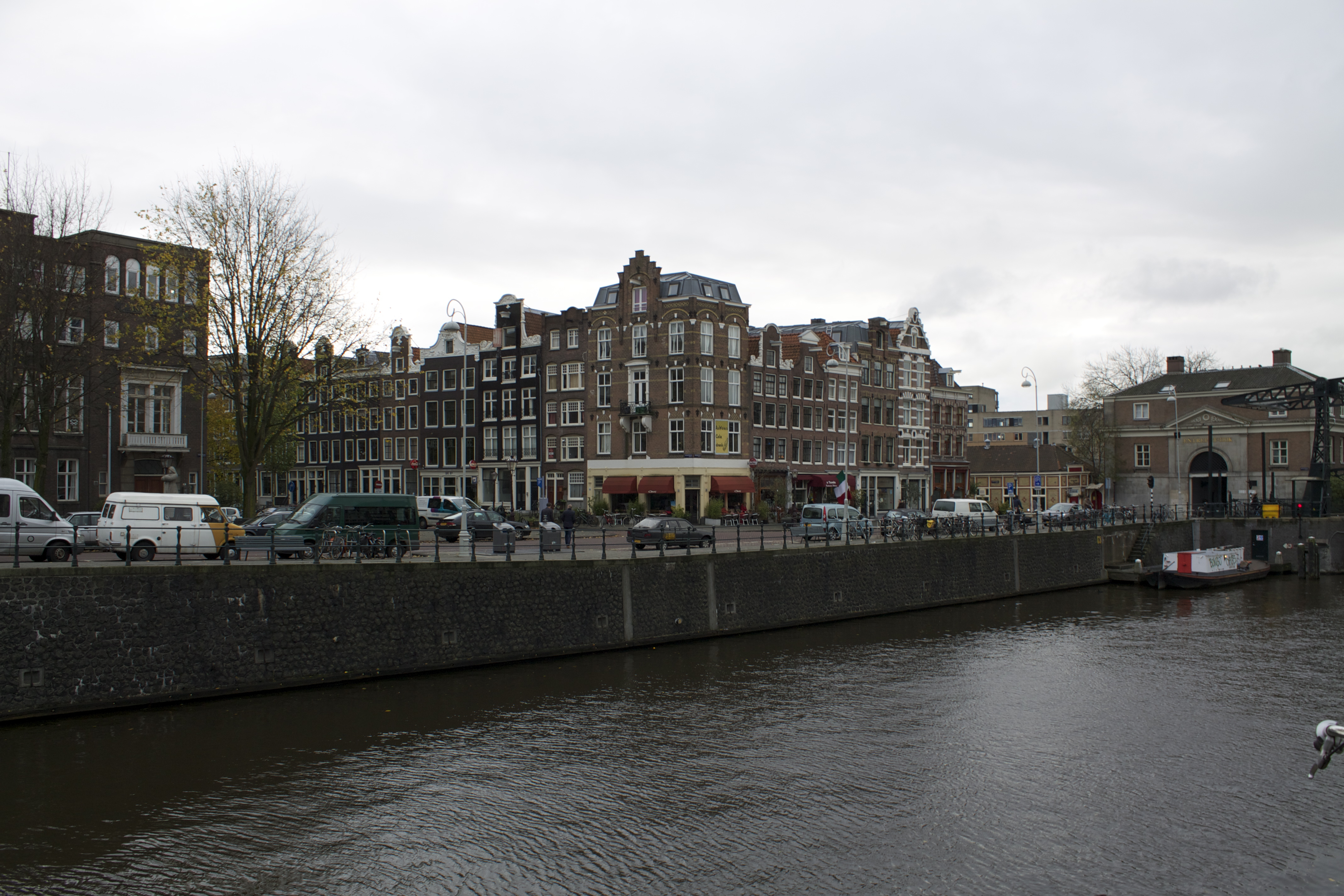
Section of the canal

== See also ==
- Canals of Amsterdam
