= Sarphatistraat =

Street in Amsterdam, the Netherlands

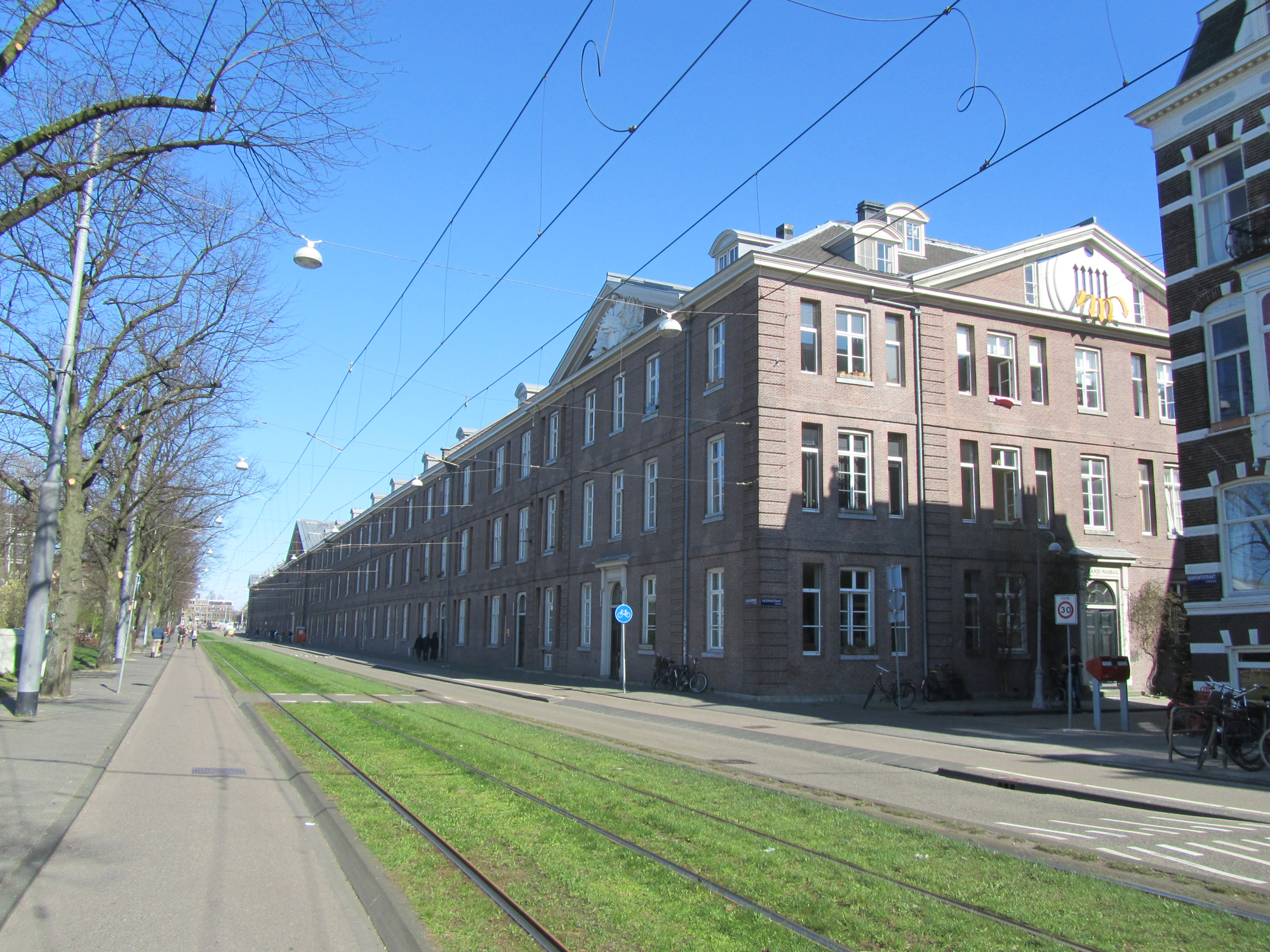
- Oranje-Nassau Kazerne, northern facade. Sarphatistraat, Amsterdam
- Interactive map of Sarphatistraat
- Length: 1.9 kilometres (1.2 mi)
- Location: Amsterdam
- Postal code: 1018
- Coordinates: 52.361944°N 4.9125°E
- From: Hogesluis
- To: Oostenburgergracht

The Sarphatistraat is a street in the center of Amsterdam between Frederiksplein and Oostenburgergracht at the Cruquiuskade. The street crosses the Amstel and forms an almost 2 kilometres (1.2 mi) long connection between the southern part of the Grachtengordel and the Oostelijke Eilanden.

== Location ==
The Sarphatistraat is the only street in Amsterdam that has the same name on both sides of the Amstel. It has been the first cycling street in Amsterdam since 2017, a street that is primarily intended for cyclists and where cars are a guest.

At the Weesperplein the Sarphatistaat intersects the main Weesperstraat–Wibautstraat route (city route s112). The street is crossed by the Weesperplein to the north, a dual carriageway section of the Weesperstraat, and to the south side by the Rhijnspoorplein a dual carriageway section of Wibautstraat.

At Roetersstraat there is a building complex known as Roeterseiland at the Sarphatistraat campus of the University of Amsterdam. At the Alexanderplein the Sarphatistraat intersects with the Plantage Middenlaan.

From 2009 to 2012, the Theater Instituut Nederland (TIN) was located at Sarphatistraat 53. The material has been transferred to the Special Collections of the University of Amsterdam .

The Sarphatipark is not on this street. That park, also named after Samuel Sarphati, is located in De Pijp.

== History ==
The Sarphatistraat was named in 1870 after the physician Samuel Sarphati (1813–66), who had a major influence on the expansion and beautification of Amsterdam. He contributed to the creation of the Paleis voor Volksvlijt on Frederiksplein and the Amstel Hotel on Professor Tulpplein.

The Sarphatistraat, which was called the Schans (Fortification) before 1870, is on the site of the city walls that fell between 1820 and 1840. The section between Leidseplein and Frederiksplein was called the Weteringschans since 1872 and the section between Haarlemmerplein and Leidseplein was called Marnixstraat.

On 14 August 1942, at the insistence of the German occupiers, a number of Amsterdam street names were changed by Mayor Edward Voûte. This applied to streets that were named after the Dutch royal family or after Jews. Until the end of World War II in 1945 the street was called Muiderschans.

The famous first sentence from Nescio's book De uitvreter (The Freeloader) reads: "Apart from the man who found Sarphatistraat the most beautiful place in Europe, I have never known a more strange guy than the freeloader". Shortly before Nescio wrote this, writer Frederik van Eeden had expressed his opinion about unwelcome adjustments to the Sarphatistraat, while he thought it was the most beautiful street in Amsterdam.

== Public transportation ==
- Tram lines 1, 7 and 19 run through the Sarphatistraat.
- At the intersection with Weesperplein and Rhijnspoorplein you will find the metro station Weesperplein in front of metro lines 51, 53 and 54 .
- Tram lines 14 cross the Sarphatistraat on Alexanderplein.
- The first tram line in Amsterdam ran through the Sarphatistraat in 1875. This Leidscheplein - Plantage horse tram line ran via the Weteringschans and Sarphatistraat. After electrification in 1903, the tram lines 7 and 10 replaced them . Line 3 ran from 1906 to 1940 between Andrieszstraat and Alexanderplein . There was a railway yard between Alexanderplein and the Dageraadsbrug (along the Oranje-Nassau Kazerne) until 1906 . In 2004 line 10 on this part of the street was extended via the Czaar Peterstraat to the Eastern Docklands, Since then this tram line runs the full length of the Sarphatistraat but was replaced by line 7 on July 22, 2018.

== Gallery ==
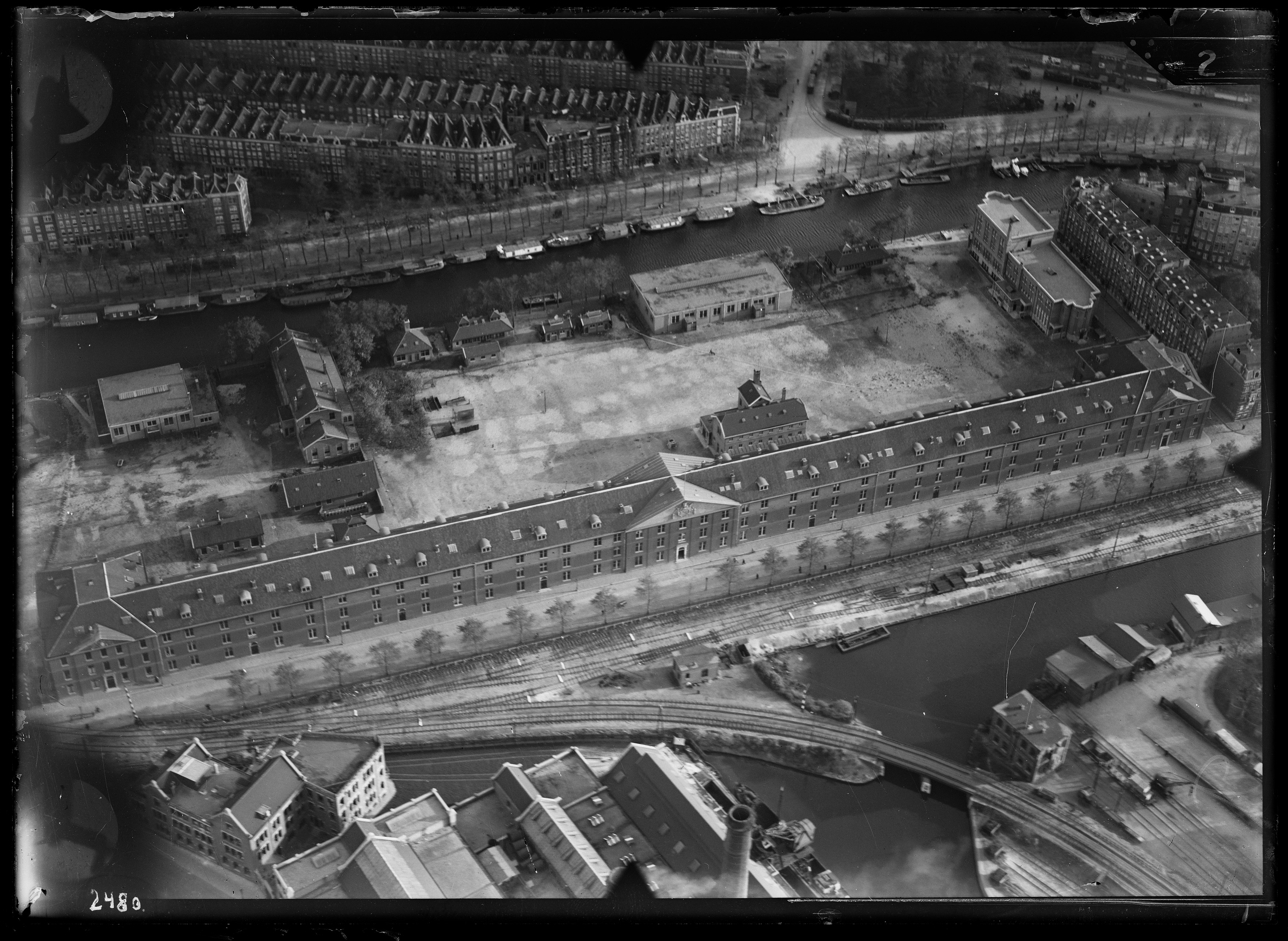
Aerial photo of the Sarphatistraat in a southerly direction

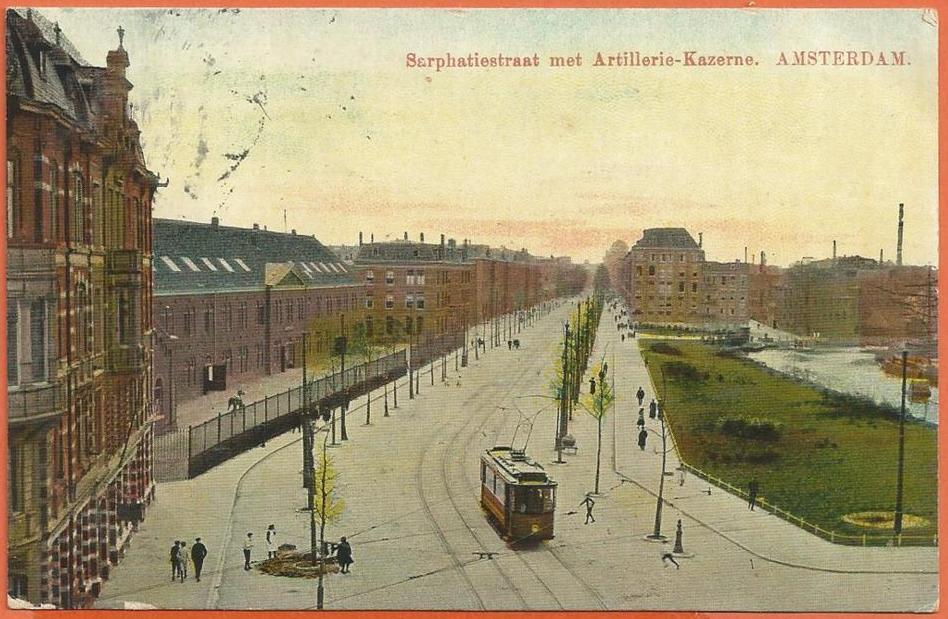
Sarphatistraat from the Muiderpoort on the Alexanderplein in a westerly direction with a line #3 tram.

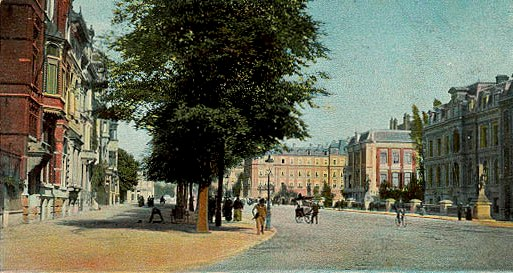
Sarphatistraat, ca. 1903

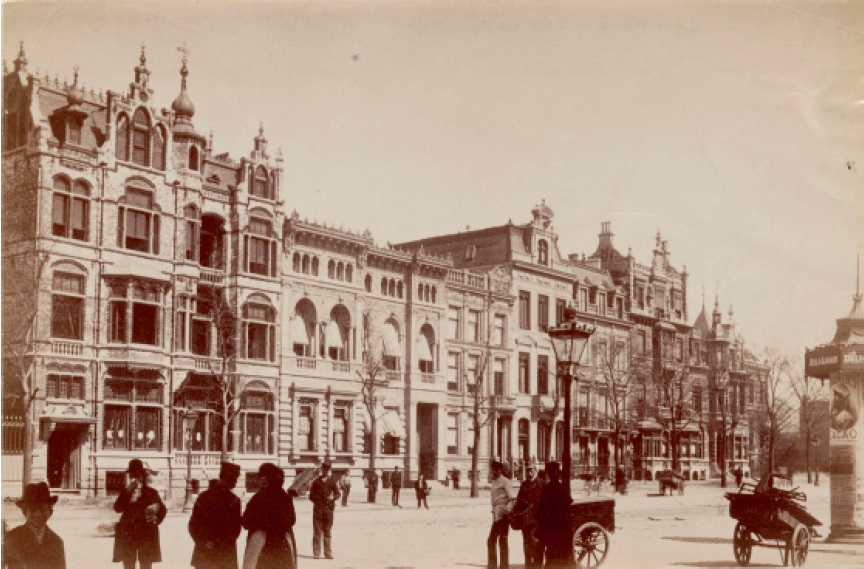
Sarphatistraat 1-15 in 1890, now partly demolished

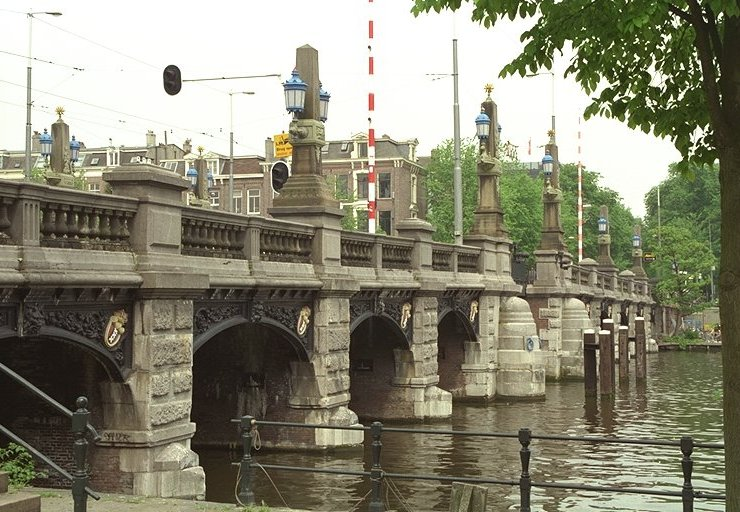
Hogesluis
