= Embassy of the Free Mind =

Museum, library, and historical site in Amsterdam, Netherlands

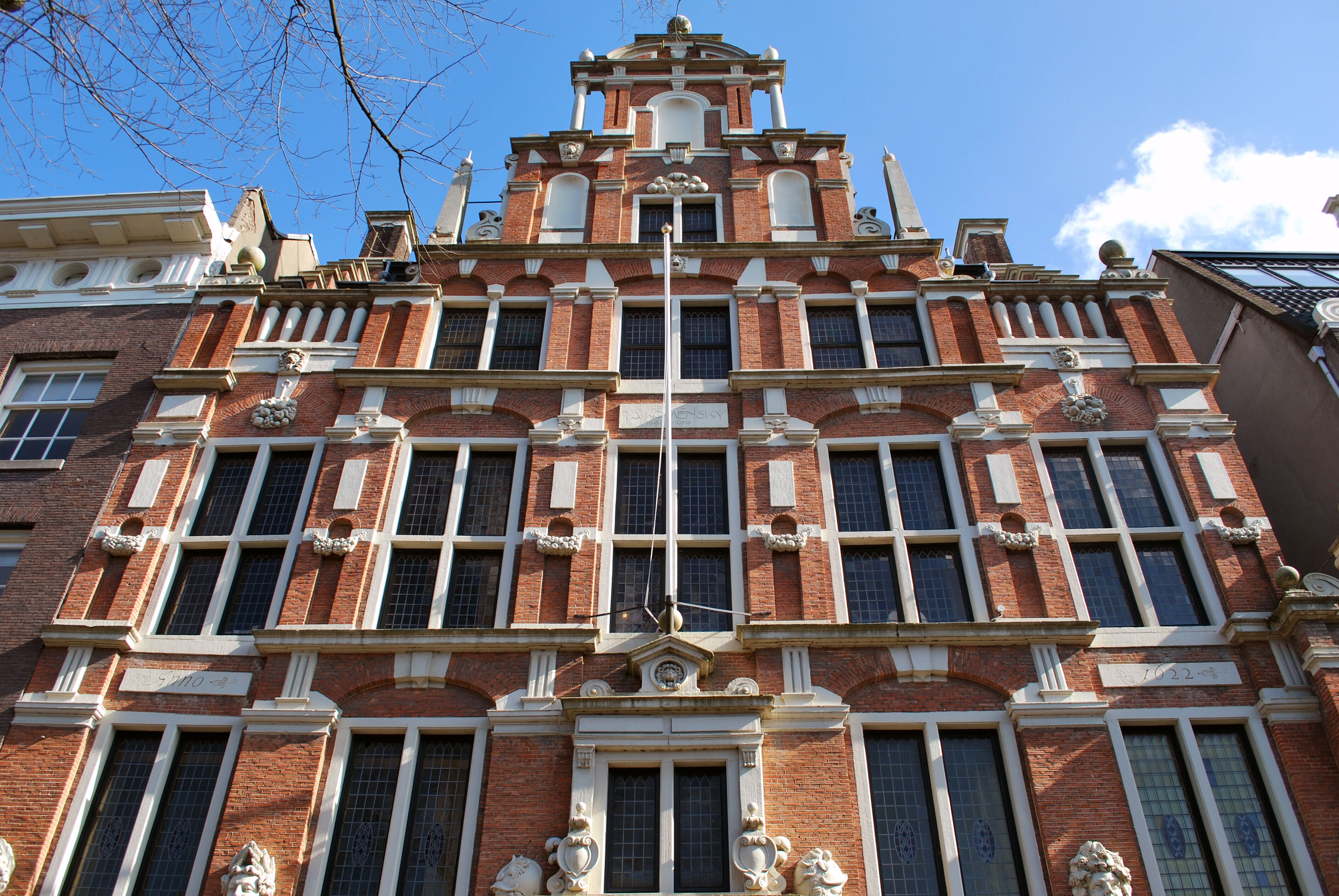

- Location within the city of Amsterdam
- Established: 2017
- Location: Keizersgracht 123; Amsterdam, Netherlands
- Coordinates: 52°22′35″N 4°53′15″E
- Type: Museum; Library; Historic site
- Collection size: c. 25,000 volumes
- Public transit access: Tram: 13 , 17 Bus: 282, 284, 288
- Website: www.embassyofthefreemind.com

The Embassy of the Free Mind is a museum, library and platform for free thinking inspired by the philosophy of the Bibliotheca Philosophica Hermetica collection. The museum focuses on the European culture of free thinking of the past 2,000 years with Hermetic wisdom as the source of inspiration: insight into the connection between God, cosmos and man. This connection is reflected in the Hermetic, alchemical, astrological, magical, mystical, kabbalistic and Rosicrucian texts and images in the collection.

== History ==
The Embassy of the Free Mind was opened in October 2017 by author Dan Brown. The roots of the museum lie in the Bibliotheca Philosophica Hermetica (or, the Ritman Library). It is a scientific research library with a collection of 25,000 books and its own publisher, and dates to 1958—when Amsterdam-based businessman Joost Ritman started it as a private library. In 1984, the library was opened to the general public and moved within Amsterdam to the Bloemstraat. Ritman brought together Hermetic manuscripts and printed books, took care of the collection, and showed their importance to the world. Since the opening, the library focused on activities like expanding the collection, the development of expertise within the Ritman research institute, and the growth of its own publisher in de Pelikaan. In 2009, the library obtained the status of Public Benefit Organisation (PBO). By moving to the House of the Heads in 2017 and obtaining the status of museum, resulting in the Embassy of the Free Mind, the organisation aimed to expand the museum to a wider audience.

== Building ==
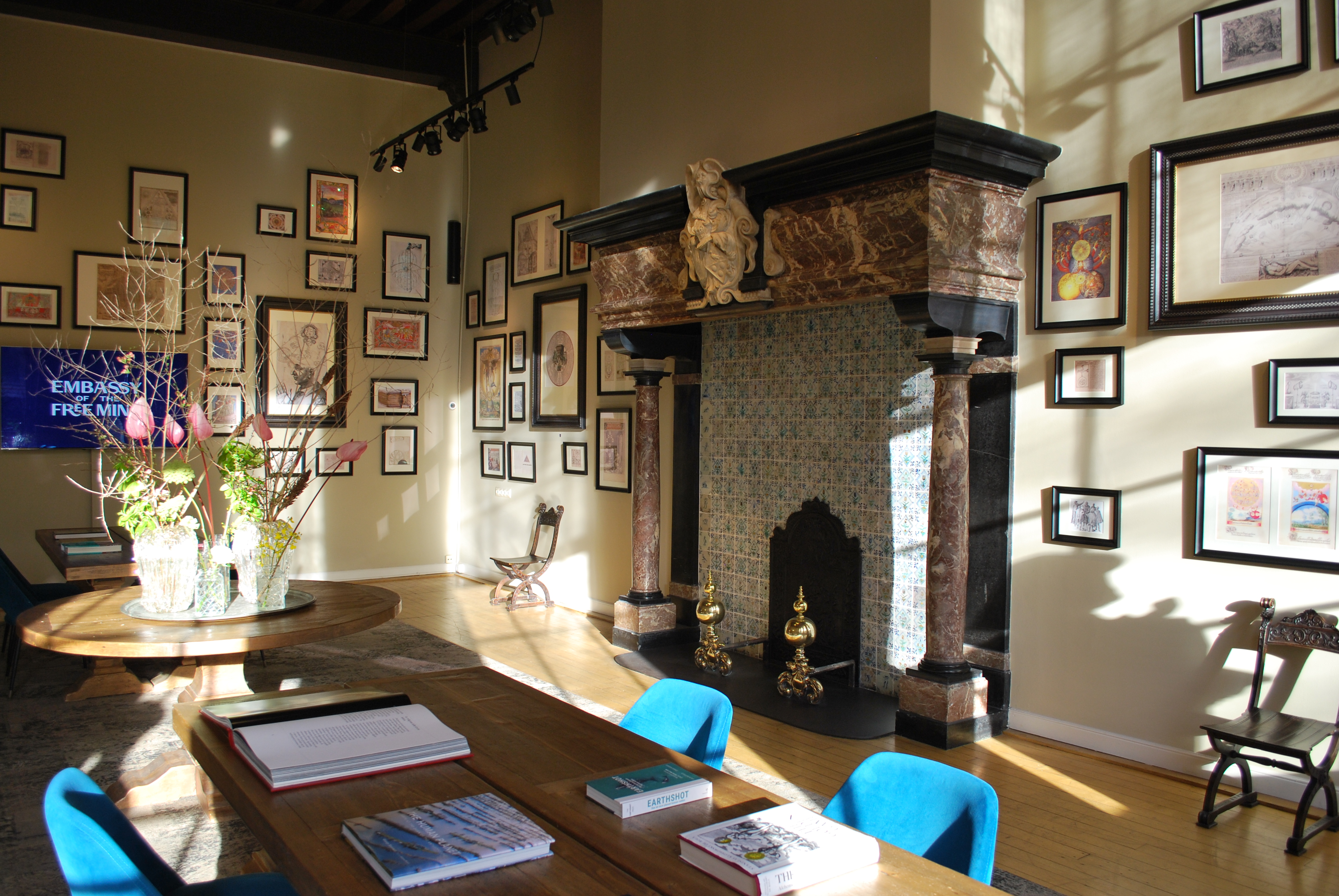
The 'Grote Sael' (Great Hall) of the building where lectures, concerts, and guided tours take place.

The Embassy of the Free Mind is located in the 17th century Amsterdam building the Huis met de Hoofden on the Keizersgracht 123. The canal house was built in 1622 by Hendrick de Keyser and is listed as one of the 'Top 100 buildings of the Dutch Rijksdienst'. Six heads adorn the façade. They depict the Roman gods Apollo, Ceres, Mercury, Minerva, Bacchus and Diana. God of commerce Mercury and goddess of wisdom Minerva were placed left and right of the central entrance in the 17th century to make it clear that this was the home of a wise merchant (Mercator Sapiens). Lodewijk and Laurens de Geer, from 1634 residents of the House with the Heads for 150 years, were besides affluent entrepreneurs also patrons of free thinkers and made the printing of their works possible. Their home library of approximately 6,000 books shows similarities with the books that are now once again in the museum library.

== Collection ==
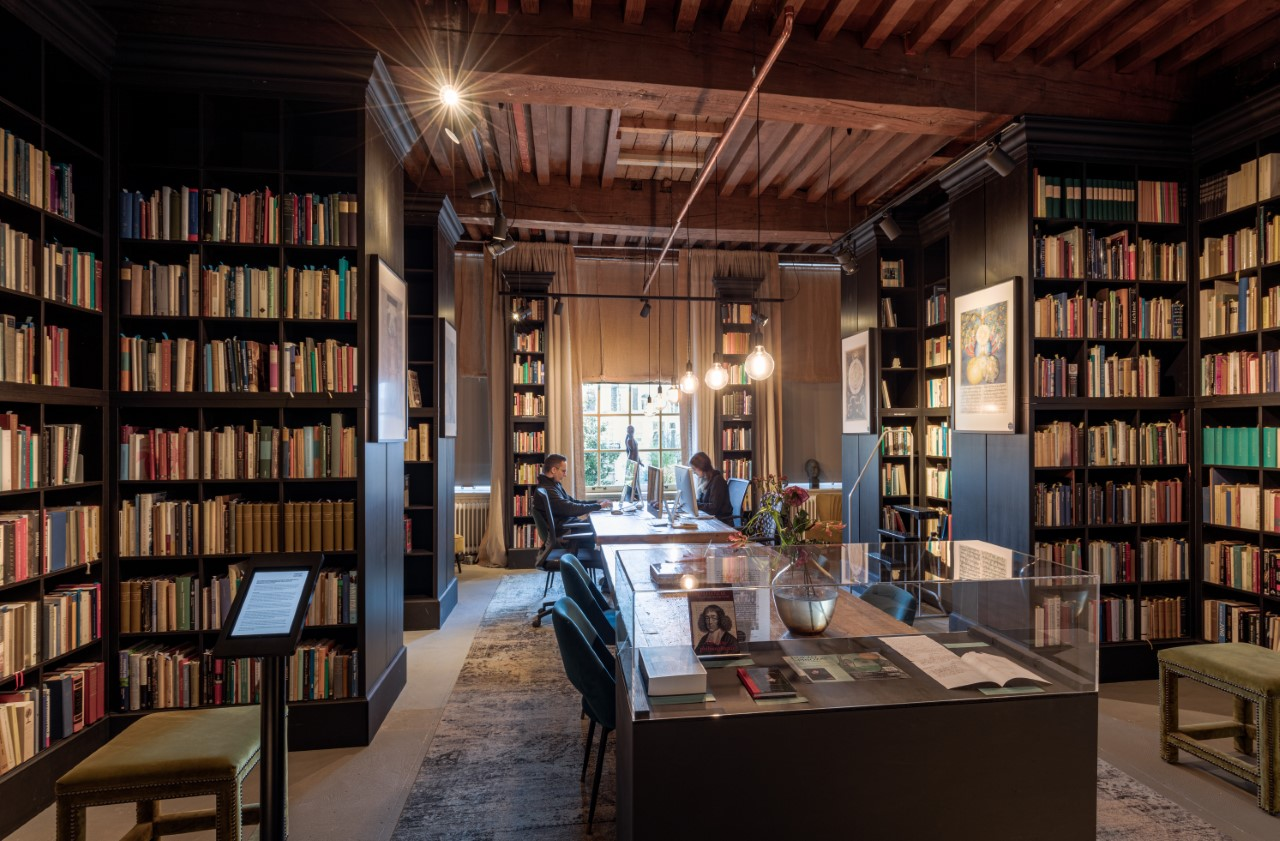
Reading room at the Embassy of the Free Mind

The museum has a collection of more than 25,000 books on Hermeticism, Rosicrucianism, alchemy, mysticism, gnosis, Western esotericism and religious studies. Other areas covered within the library include sufism, kabbalah, anthroposophy, theosophy, pansophism, freemasonry and the Holy Grail.

The library owns about 4,500 manuscripts and printed books from before 1900, and more than 20,000 books (primary and secondary sources) printed after 1900. The collection of the Bibliotheca Philosophica Hermetica includes Corpus Hermeticum (1503) printed on parchment, Robert Fludd's Utriusque cosmi historia (1617). Moreover, the museum possesses Atalanta Fugiens (1617) written by Michael Maier, the Biblia Polyglotta (1573) printed by Christoffel Plantijn, and a collection of works by Gustav Meyrink.

== Source Library ==
Source Library is an initiative of the Embassy of the Free mind, which was launched on February 22nd, 2026. Source Library is a digital library with more than 15.000 rare historical texts with a focus on the fifteenth through nineteenth centuries. Using artificial intelligence, these texts are translated into modern English. This collection includes works from thirteen major digital libraries worldwide. Source Library is free to read and cite.

== Exhibitions , ==
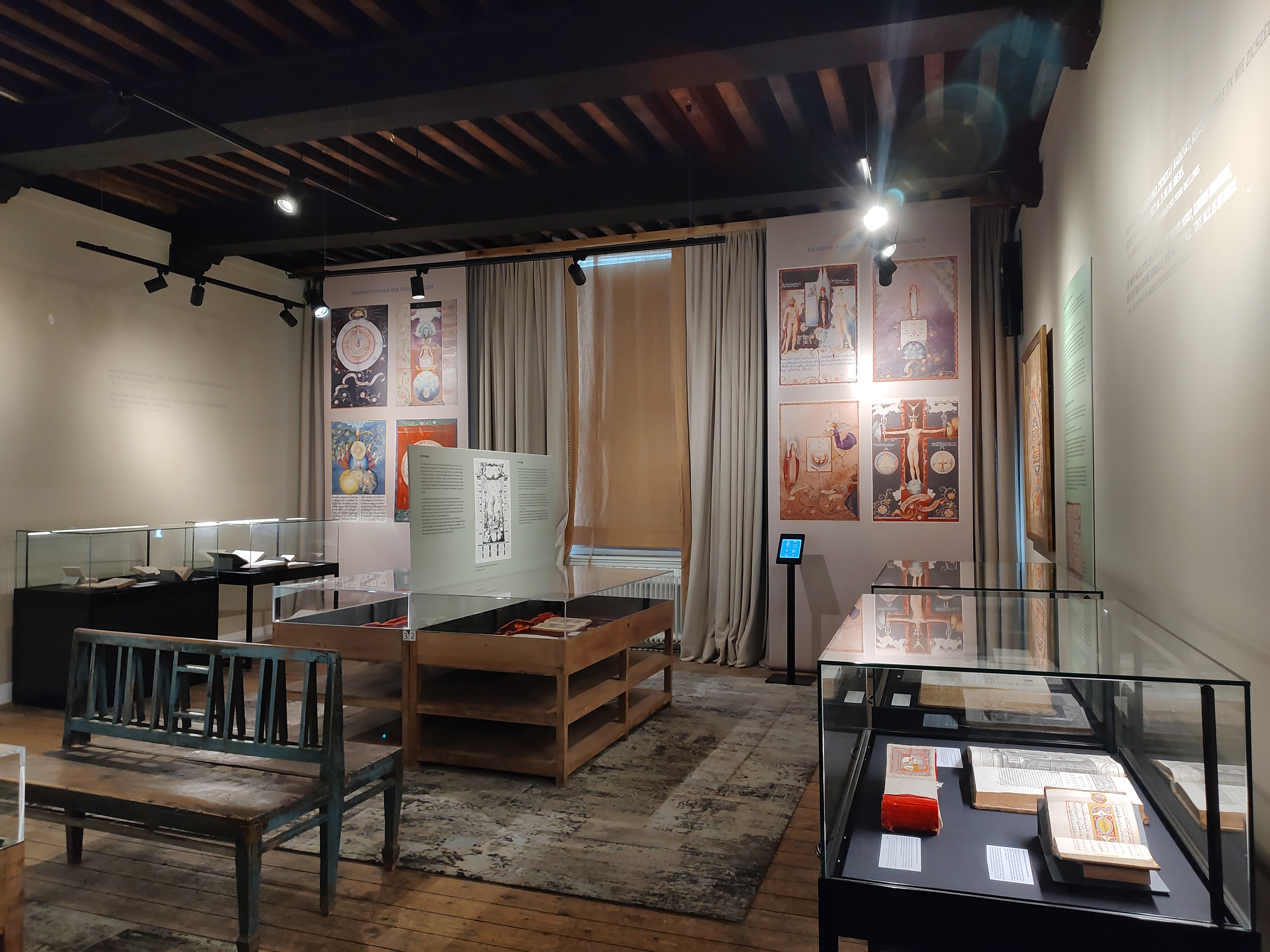
Exhibition Room of the Embassy of the Free Mind

The permanent exhibition of the Embassy of the Free Mind consists of 200 reproductions of images from manuscripts and old printed books from c. 1500–1900. The images display the contents of the books on the collected wisdom from the core BPH collection. On the first floor, an exhibition room offers space for temporary installations and the display of rare books from the collection. In addition, there is a reading room with approximately 2,000 modern books and several works of art, such as the 'Grail of Amsterdam'. The museum offers daily guided tours of the museum and the exhibition. Monthly lunch concerts with conservatory musicians take place in the Grote Sael. Admission is free with a museum card/city pass/icom/Amsterdam City card.
