= Keizersgracht 143 =

Canal house in Amsterdam, the Netherlands

Coordinates: 52.3758°N 4.8868°E

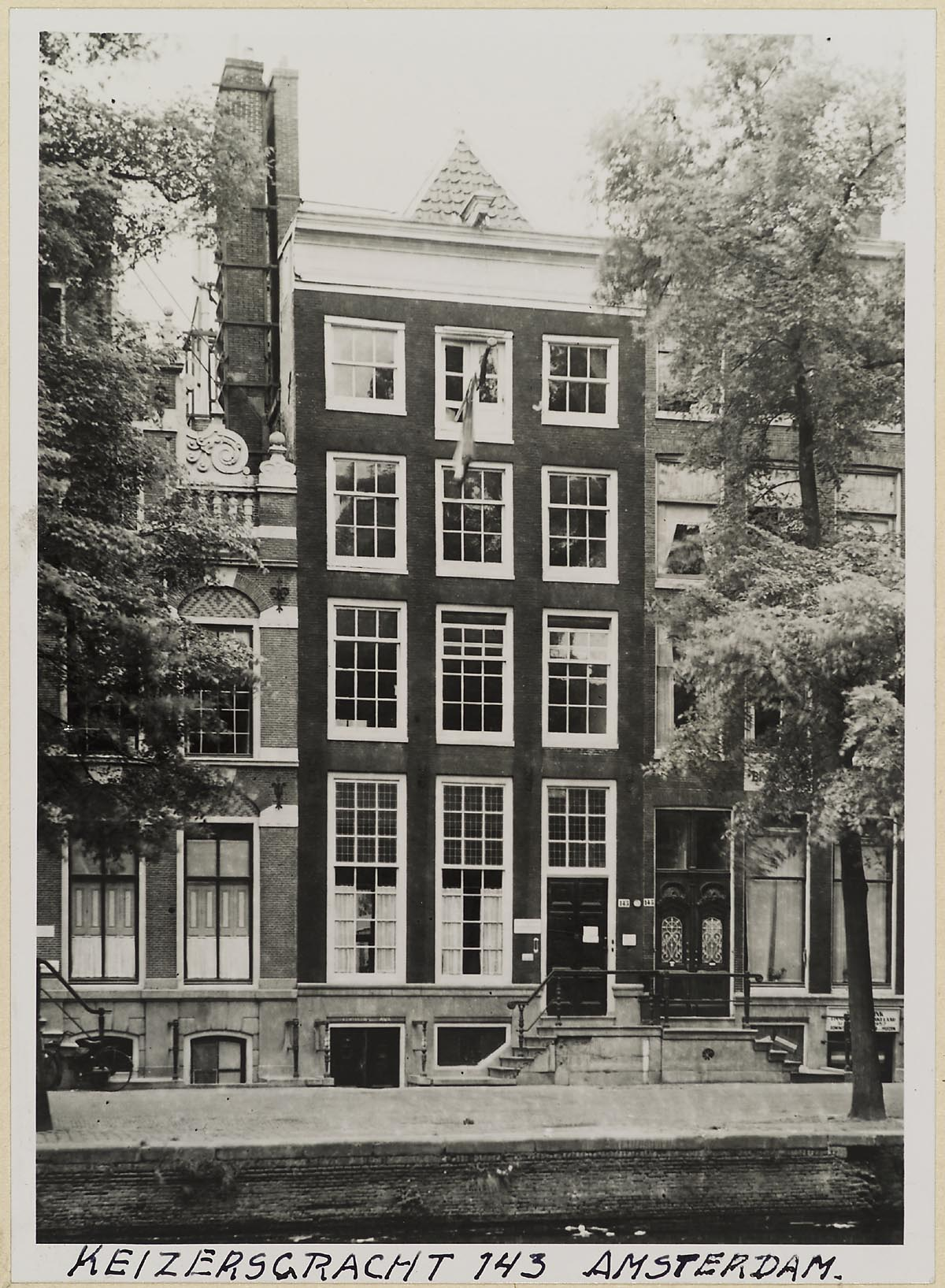
Keizersgracht 143

1859 ad announcing opening of insurance office in the building

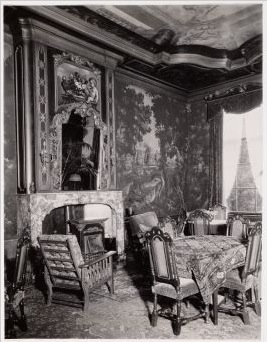
Interior of Professor Ursul Philip Boissevain's house, about 1914

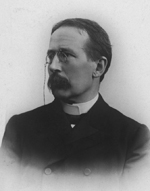
Ursul Philip Boissevain

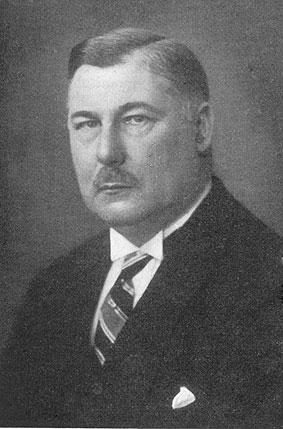
Walrave Boissevain

Keizersgracht 143 is a canal house on the eastern side of the Keizersgracht between Leliegracht and Herenstraat in Amsterdam. It is a national monument of "very high value" (zeer hoge waarde) and "national distinction" (nationale kenmerkendheid) according to the Dutch Cultural Heritage agency.

== Construction ==
It was built shortly after 1700. The façade and sculpted staircase dates to the 18th century while the door and white pediment at the top of the house are from the 19th.

== Residents and Functions ==
- In 1855, Carel Tellinger (b. 1817, Naples) lived here. He was a co-founder of the Tanah Wangie-maatschappij, a trading company in the Dutch East Indies.
- At some point between 1855 and 1864, the Boissevain family, a patrician family of Huguenot origin, acquired the house and various Boissevains lived there until 1930:
  - Henri Jean Arnaud Boissevain (1813–1891) lived here and worked here at his insurance brokerage "H.J.A. Boissevain and Sons", which moved here in 1859.
  - Ursul Philip Boissevain (or Ursulus Philippus, U.Ph.Boissevain) (1855–1930), a professor of ancient history and Roman antiquities at the University of Groningen and member of the Royal Netherlands Academy of Arts and Sciences, lived here. He was an author of historical works, especially active from 1898 to 1930. He lived here with his wife Wilhelmina Carolina Momma.
  - Walrave Boissevain (Wikipedia article in Dutch) (1876–1944), a Dutch liberal politician, lived here from at least 1916–1924.
- There is however evidence that a Ms. J. van Hattum also lived here in 1921.
- In May 1931, Willem Cohen acquired the house. During World War II a Jewish resident Ms. Betje Cohen (1898–1942) was rounded up; she died in 1942 in Auschwitz. Two children who had been living at home survived.
- In September 1946 Mr. Dirk van Laane (b. 1887) acquired the property
- For some time during the 1940s and 1950s, the house was used for offices for the cable radio service: the switchboard, technical service, and administration.
- The Department of Securities Registration of the Council for Restitution (Afdeling Effectenregistratie van de Raad voor het Rechtsherstel) was housed here after that. Stichting Jokos, a Jewish foundation for restitution, was also here from its founding in 1958 until at least 1960.
- During the 1960s and 70s the Vrije Universiteit Amsterdam (Free University of Amsterdam) used the building. There are references in 1962 to a Botanical-Zoological Laboratory (Botanisch-Zoölogisch Laboratorium) here and later in 1967–1968 the Institute for Applied Linguistics (Instituut voor Toegepaste Taalwetenschap).
- The building is currently a condominium

== Interior ==
The entire interior of a main room dating back to 1710 including tapestries was removed in 1931 and is now on display in The Hague at the Kunstmuseum Den Haag (with the name of the Gobelin Room). The ceiling paintings look up into heaven where the Roman goddesses of wisdom (Minerva) and Justice (Justitia), are floating. The tapestries by Alexander Baert of Oudenaarde show an imaginary nature scene.

18th century ceiling paintings remain in the front room on the ground floor.

== Former house number ==
In the house numbering system prior to 1875, the house had the number 199 in district RR ("RR 199").

In the house numbering system previous to that (before 1853) the house had number (kleine nummer) 324 in district 45.
