= Huis met de Hoofden =

Dutch canal house

Coordinates: 52°22′35″N 4°53′15″E

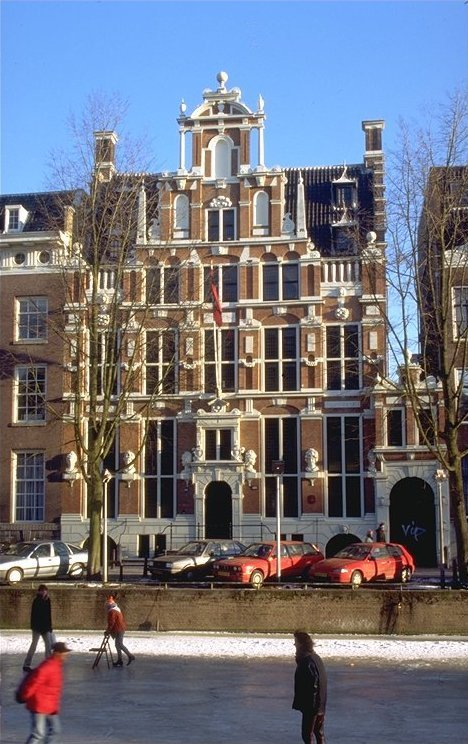
House with the Heads at Keizersgracht 123 in Amsterdam

The House with the Heads (known as 'Huis met de Hoofden' in Dutch) is a large canal house on the Keizersgracht 123 in Amsterdam, named after the six ornaments shaped as heads, which are on the façade. The house is a rijksmonument and is listed on the Top 100 Dutch heritage sites.

Nowadays the building is home to the Embassy of the Free Mind, a museum and platform for culture, music, art, science and spirituality.

== History ==
The house was built in 1622 for Nicolaas Sohier, a wealthy stock trader and art lover. The renaissance façade is attributed to architect Hendrick de Keyser, but was probably executed and completed by his son Pieter de Keyser, as Hendrick had already died in 1621.

As for the heads in the façade, there is a legend that they refer to six thieves who had tried to break in the house and were then beheaded by the maid. However, the ornaments are said to be images of six Roman gods: Apollo with the laurel wreath (the arts); Ceres with the grain (agriculture); Mercury with the winged helmet (trade); Minerva (wisdom); Bacchus with the grapes (wine); and Diana with the half moon (hunt).

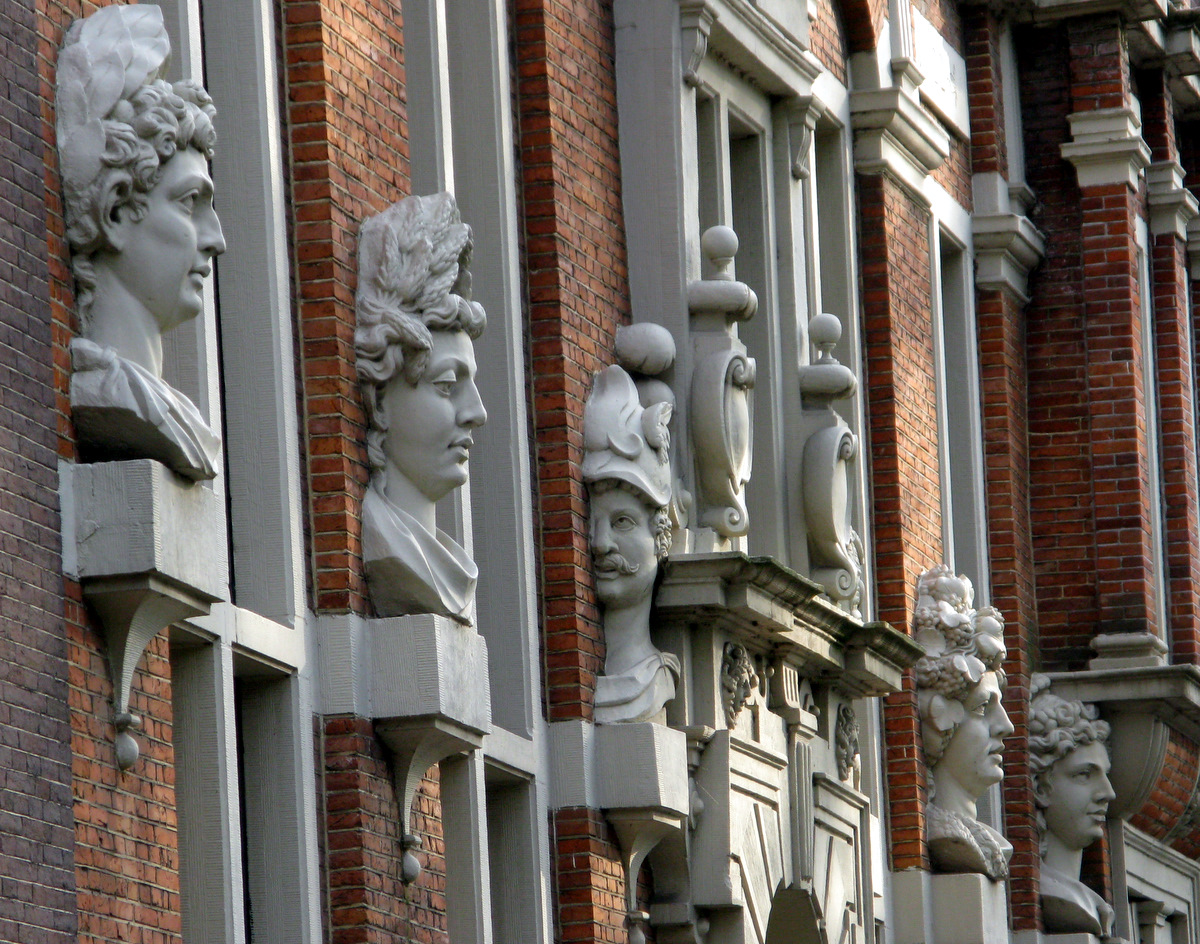
The heads on the façade

== Residents ==
Shortly after Sohier moved to the house, his wife and two daughters died. In 1634 he sold the property to Dutch entrepreneur and industrialist Louis de Geer.

Along four generations the house remained in possession of the family De Geer, who made it a nerve center of exchange for ideas in respect to trade, science, philosophy and culture. Comenius, members of the prominent Elsevier publishing family and possibly Spinoza are said to be guests of the De Geer. Between 1752 en 1775 Anthoni Grill rented the house from the inheritants, who sold it in 1779.

In 1811 art dealer Cornelis Sebille Roos settled in the building. After 1865 an Hogere Burgerschool was established in the house, followed by a public trade school in 1869. After a restoration in 1907 by the municipality, it served the Conservatorium van Amsterdam from 1909 to 1931. A fur trade and a city’s bureau for monuments and archeology were also later established.

At the end of February 2006 it was announced that the Huis met de Hoofden had been sold to businessman and art collector Joost Ritman. Today the building is home to museum The Embassy of the Free Mind, which comprises part of the Bibliotheca Philosophica Hermetica.
