= Bibliotheca Philosophica Hermetica =

Library of Hermetic works in Amsterdam

Coordinates: 52.3743°N 4.8822°E

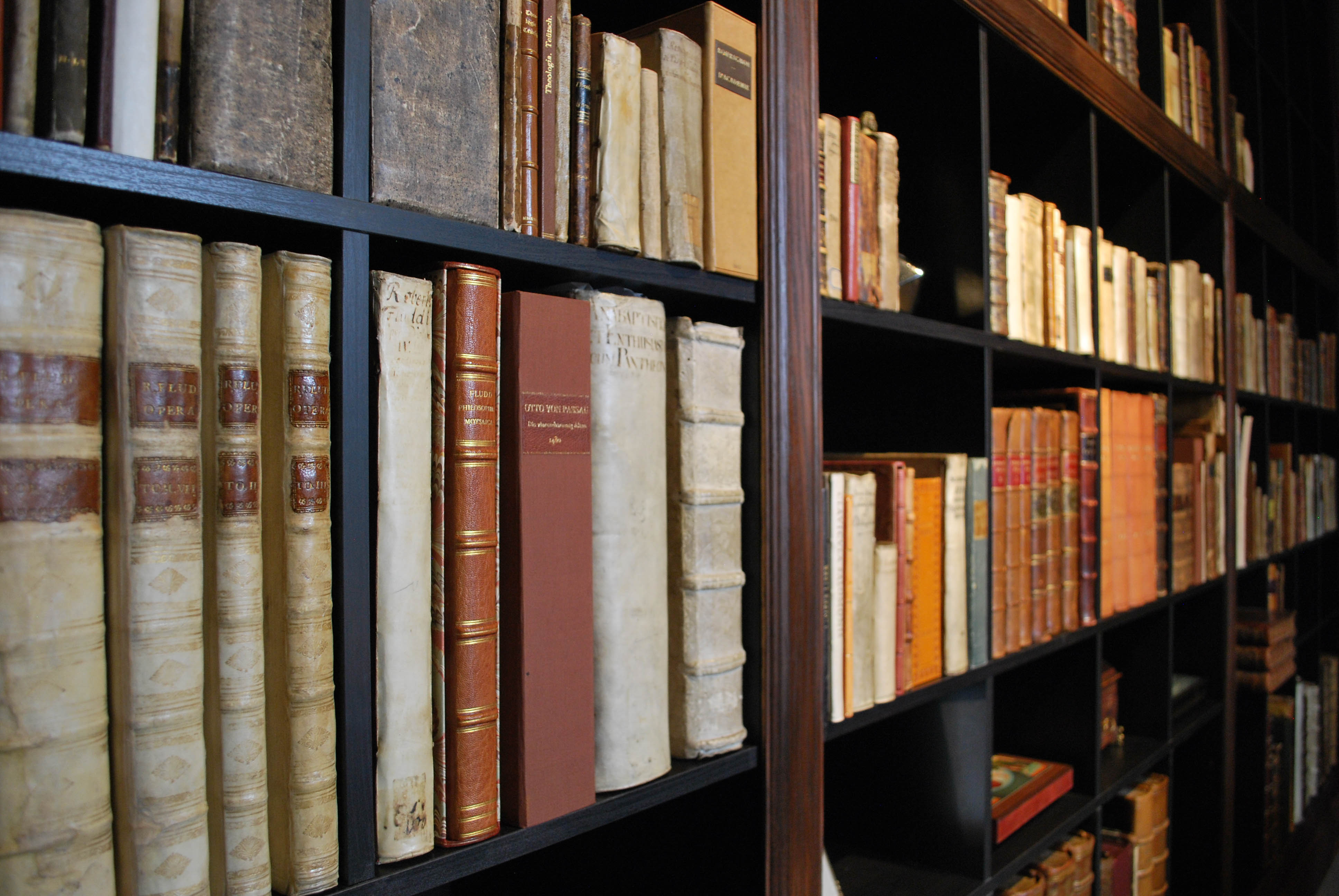
Rare BPH books, featuring the collected works of Robert Fludd on the left

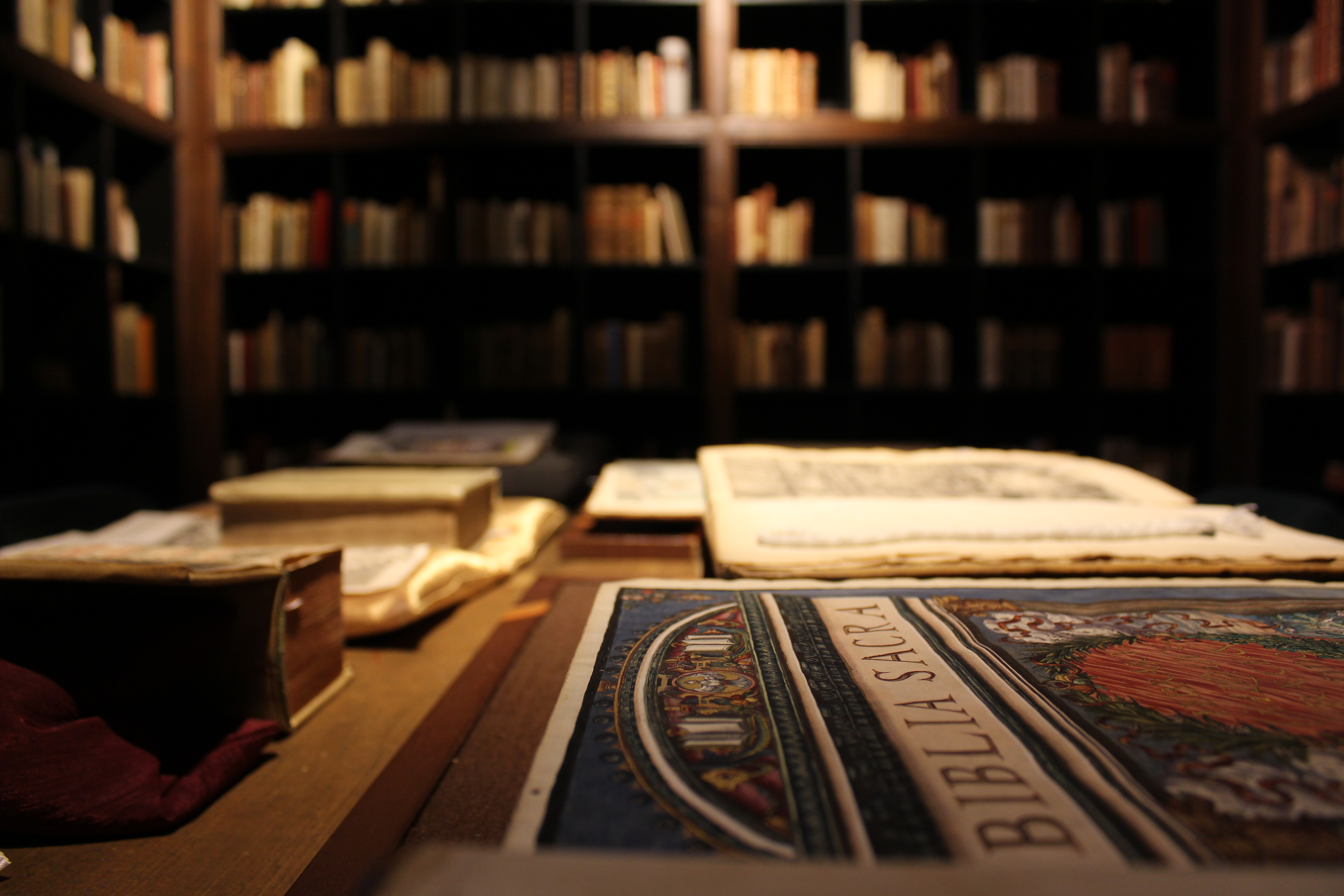
Rare books on display in the Ritman Research Institute

Bibliotheca Philosophica Hermetica (BPH) or The Ritman Library is a Dutch library founded by Joost Ritman located in the Huis met de Hoofden (House with the Heads) at Keizersgracht 123, in the center of Amsterdam. The Bibliotheca Philosophica Hermetica brings together manuscripts and printed works in the field of Hermeticism, more specifically what it likes to call the 'Christian-Hermetic tradition'.

The Embassy of the Free Mind is a museum, library, and intellectual platform inspired by the collection.

== The library ==
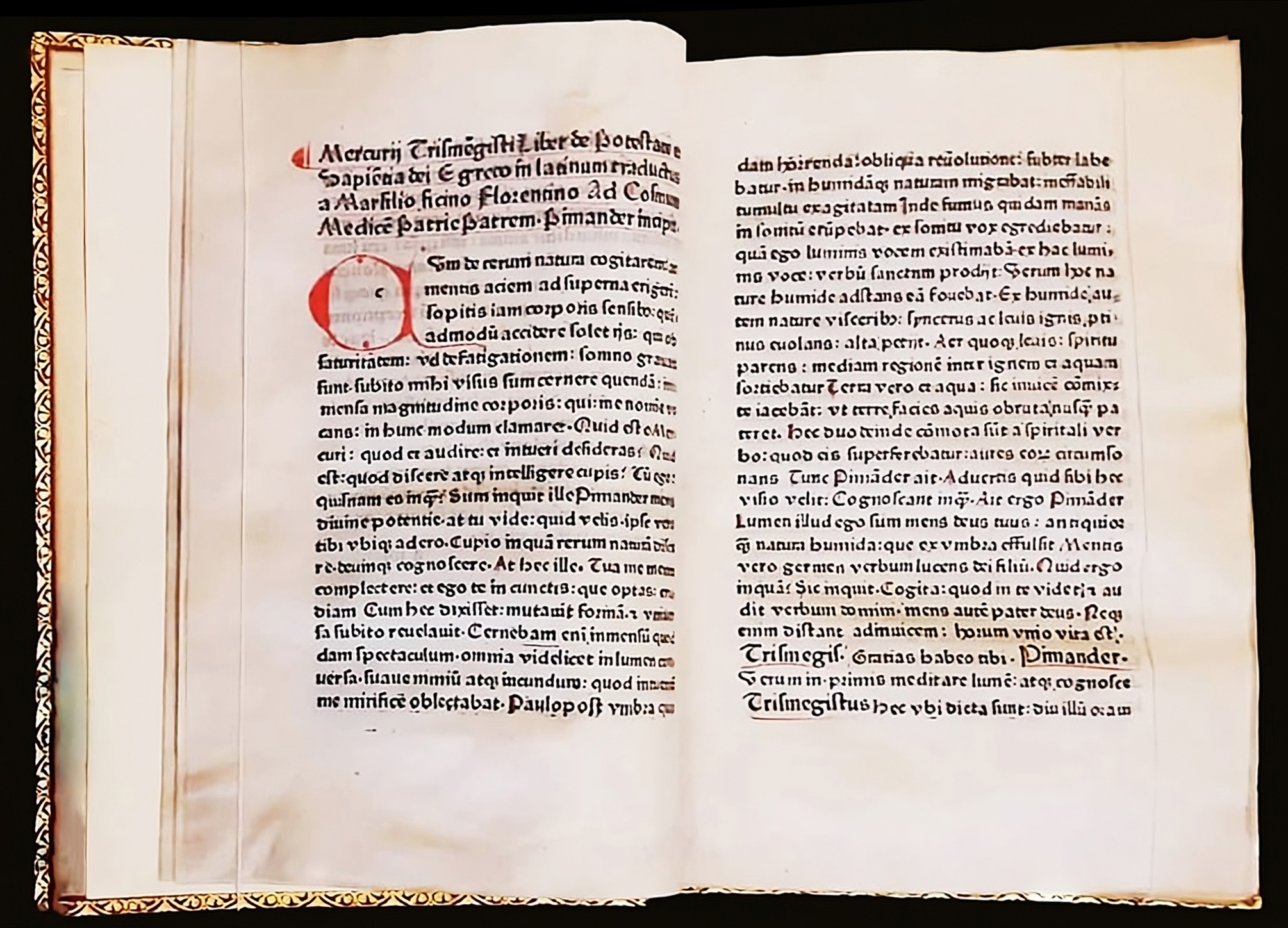
Corpus Hermeticum: Latin translation by Marsilio Ficino, 1503 CE from the Ritman Library.

The Bibliotheca Philosophica Hermetica was founded in 1957 by Joost R. Ritman and opened to the public in 1984. The library is now supported by a foundation and is a public institution. The Bibliotheca co-operates with international libraries and organizations, such as the Russian Rudomino Library for Foreign Literature in Moscow, the Herzog August Bibliothek in Wolfenbüttel, the Biblioteca Medicea Laurenziana in Florence, and the Biblioteca Marciana in Venice.

To date, the library holds more than 23,000 volumes on hermetica, Rosicrucianism, alchemy, mysticism, gnosis, esotericism and comparative religion, and has great scientific, artistic, and cultural value. Other areas of the collection are Sufism, Kabbalah, anthroposophy, theosophy, pansophy, Freemasonry, and the Grail. The entire Bibliotheca Philosophica Hermetica collection consists of around 28,000 books, including around 7,500 books printed before 1800, 70 incunables, 700 post-1550 manuscripts, and 25 manuscripts written before 1550. The remaining books are post 1800. Many items in the library are one of a kind. Among the treasures of the Bibliotheca Philosophica Hermetica are the Corpus Hermeticum published in 1471, the first illustrated edition of Dante's La Divina Commedia from 1481, and Cicero's De Officiis printed in 1465.

== Past ==
The founder of the library, Joost R. Ritman (1941), was an Amsterdam businessman with a deep interest in spirituality. He began collecting rare books at a young age, after his mother presented him with a copy of a seventeenth-century edition of Aurora, a work whose author, Jacob Böhme, proved a lasting source of inspiration to him. When he conceived the plan to turn his private collection of books into a library, his vision was to bring together under one roof manuscripts and printed works in the field of the Hermetic tradition, and to show the interrelatedness between the various collecting areas and their relevance for the present day. Following a difficult year in the shadow of the financial crisis and cuts, The Ritman Library reopened its doors on December 16, 2011.

In 2016, Ritman purchased and donated a national monument, the Huis met de Hoofden (House with the Heads) located at Keizersgracht 123 to house the BPH collection and make possible supporting programs – including exhibition spaces, a research institute, and seminar rooms. In 2016 a major digitization project was begun and by Spring of 2017 over 2000 of the rarest works were made available on-line.

Following a ceremonial grand opening of the museum by the Ritman family and author Dan Brown, the Embassy of the Free Mind opened its doors to the public in 2017.

== Present ==
The “House with the Heads” currently houses four major institutions that are linked to one another: a library, museum, research institute and academy. The library and research institute work together to develop content that flows into the exhibitions of the museum, the courses offered in the academy, and the publications of the research institute. The central institution is the library and the content for the other institutions grows out of the books and manuscripts held within it.

The building Huis met de Hoofden is currently undergoing a major renovation to create more space for its programs. In 2022 a new reading room was established on the second floor of the building. This room contains a selection of the most important secondary research literature for students, researchers and the public. There are further stacks of research literature in the basement of the building that can be accessed on request. The core collection of rare historic books, manuscripts, and incunables can also be viewed and studied on request for academic purpose.

== Future ==
The library is currently focusing on reshaping the once privately funded library into a self-sustaining and public institution. The originally private library therefore acquired the status of a Public Benefit Institution (ANBI). With the rehousing to the Keizersgracht 123 in 2017, a new era begins in which the library will be passed on to a new generation and made accessible to a broader audience.

== Digitizing the collection ==
In June 2016 it was announced that author Dan Brown, who did research in the library for some of his books, was donating €300,000. This money was to be used to digitize the library's core collection of 4,600 early printed books and 300 older manuscripts. These were to be available online in spring 2017. The Prins Bernhard Cultuurfonds was donating €15,000.

== UNESCO Recognition ==
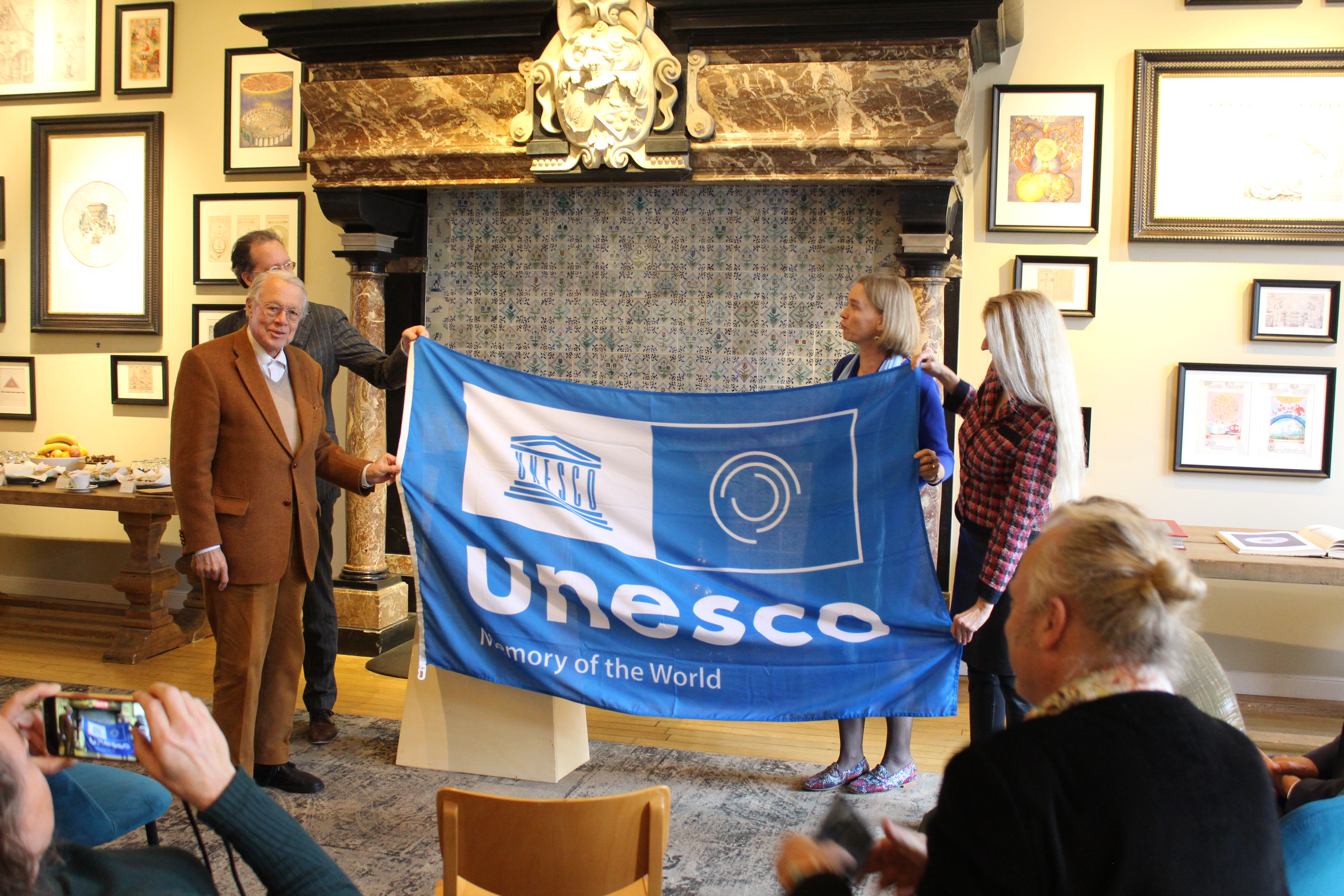
Joost Ritman accepting UNESCO Memory of the World flag in November 2022

In November of 2022 the BPH collection housed at the Embassy of the Free Mind as well as the state owned portion located at the Allard Pierson Museum was granted special 'Memory of the World' status by UNESCO Nederlandse.

== See also ==
- List of libraries in the Netherlands

== Publications (selection) ==
- De klassieke erfenis der Rozenkruisers, catalogus bij een tentoonstelling in de Bibliotheca Philosophica Hermetica. (Hermesreeks 1), vi, 31, [9] pp.
- F. van Lamoen, Abraham Willemsz van Beyerland. Jacob Böhme en het Nederlandse hermetisme in de 17e eeuw. (Hermesreeks 2), 40 pp.
- C. Gilly, Johann Valentin Andreae. Die Manifeste der Rosenkreuzerbruderschaft 1586-1986. (Hermesreeks 3), 114 pp. ISBN 90-71608-02-6 (2nd ed. 1986).
- De Hermetische Gnosis. Catalogus van een tentoonstelling in de Bibliotheca Philosophica Hermetica. Compiled by F. van Lamoen.(Hermesreeks 4), 88 pp. (2nd ed. 1990).
- Choix des sources de l'ésotérisme occidental. (Hermesreeks 5), [38 pp.]
- H.M.E. de Jong, Les symboles spirituels de l'alchimie. Exposition à l'occasion du Festival International de l'Esotérisme. (Hermesreeks 6), 143 pp.
- C. Gilly (red.), Das Erbe des Christian Rosenkreuz. Johann Valentin Andreae 1586-1986 und die Manifeste der Rosenkreuzerbruderschaft 1614-1616. 228 pp. ISBN 3-7762-0279-3
- F. van Lamoen, The Hermetic gnosis. Catalogue of an exhibition at the Bibliotheca Philosophica Hermetica. (Hermesreeks 7), 88 pp.
- F. Secret, Kabbale et philosophie hermétique. Exposition à l'occasion du Festival International de l'Esotérisme. (Hermesreeks 8), 119 pp.
- Corpus Hermeticum. Introduction and translation by R. van den Broek en G. Quispel. Amsterdam; In de Pelikaan, 1990. (Pimander. Texts and Studies published by the Bibliotheca Philosophica Hermetica 2). 206 pp. ISBN 90-71608-08-5 (5th ed. 2003).
- F. van Lamoen, Hermes Trismegistus. Pater philosophorum. Tekstgeschiedenis van het Corpus Hermeticum. (Hermesreeks 9), 152 pp. (2nd ed. 1990).
- F. Secret, Kabbala en hermetische filosofie. Tentoonstelling in de Bibliotheca Philosophica Hermetica. (Hermesreeks 10), 147 pp. Translation of Kabbale et philosophie hermétique.
- [Also available as e-book:] F. van Lamoen, La Gnose hermétique. Exposition à l'occasion du Festival International de l'Esotérisme. (Hermesreeks 11), 87 pp. Translation of De hermetische gnosis
- Johannes Amos Comenius. Via Lucis. De weg van het licht. Translated by J.M. Schadd and R.M. Bouthoorn. (Pimander. Texts and Studies published by the Bibliotheca Philosophica Hermetica 3). 183 pp. ISBN 90-263-1196-6
- J. Bouman, Splendor solis. Een 16e-eeuwse alchemistische traditie verbeeld in 1992. (Hermesreeks 12), [18 pp.].
- C. Gilly, 500 Years of Gnosis in Europe. Exhibition of printed books and manuscripts from the gnostic tradition. (Hermesreeks 13), 312 pp.
- C. Gilly, Paracelsus in der Bibliotheca Philosophica Hermetica. Ausstellung zum 500. Geburtsjahr des Theophrastus Bombast von Hohenheim, Paracelsus genannt. (Hermesreeks 14), 85 pp. ISBN 90-71608-03-4
- C. Gilly, Adam Haslmayr. Der erste Verkünder der Manifeste der Rosenkreuzer. (Pimander. Texts and Studies published by the Bibliotheca Philosophica Hermetica 5). 296 pp. Index. ISBN 3-7728-1698-3
- [Also available as e-book:]. A. McLean, The Silent language. The symbols of hermetic philosophy. (Hermesreeks 15), 92 pp. ISBN 90-71608-05-0
- C. Gilly, Cimelia Rhodostaurotica. Die Rosenkreuzer im Spiegel der zwischen 1610 und 1660 entstandenen Handschriften und Drucke. (Hermesreeks 16), xii, 191 pp. ISBN 90-71608-06-9 (2nd rev. ed. 1995)
- S. Gentile en C. Gilly, Marsilio Ficino e il ritorno di Ermete Trismegisto/Marsilio Ficino and the Return of Hermes Trismegistus. Firenze: Centro Di, 1999. 326 pp. ISBN 88-7038-339-3 (2nd rev. ed. 2001)
- Magia, alchimia, scienza dal '400 al '700. L'influsso di Ermete Trismegisto/Magic, Alchemy, and Science 15th-18th centuries. The Influence of Hermes Trismegistus. Red. C. Gilly en C. van Heertum. Florence: Centro Di, 2002. Vol. 1 (essays). 588 pp. Illus. ISBN 88-7038-359-8
- Asclepius. De volkomen openbaring van Hermes Trismegistus. Translated by G. Quispel. (Pimander. Texts and Studies published by the Bibliotheca Philosophica Hermetica 6). 306 pp. ISBN 90-71608-07-7
- J. Bouman en C. van Heertum, Niet voor geleerden: Handschriften in de volkstaal uit de hermetische traditie'. Catalogue of an exhibition in the Bibliotheca Philosophica Hermetica (Hermesreeks 17-1), 15 pp. Not for scholars. Manuscripts in the vernacular from the hermetic tradition.(Hermesreeks 17-2), 15pp.
- From Poimandres to Jacob Böhme: Gnosis, Hermetism and the Christian Tradition. Red. R. van den Broek en C. van Heertum. (Pimander. Texts and Studies published by the Bibliotheca Philosophica Hermetica 4). 432 pp. Index, illus. ISBN 90-71608-10-7
- Rosenkreuz als europäisches Phänomen im 17. Jahrhundert. Red. F. Niewöhner en C. Gilly. (Pimander. Texts and Studies published by the Bibliotheca Philosophica Hermetica 7). 406 pp. Index, illus. ISBN 3-7728-2206-1
- Gilles Quispel. Valentinus de gnosticus en zijn Evangelie der Waarheid (Pimander. Texts and Studies published by the Bibliotheca Philosophica Hermetica 8). 147 pp. Illus. ISBN 90-71608-131
- [Also available as e-book:] Antonin Gadal. De triomf van de universele gnosis. (Pimander. Texts and Studies published by the Bibliotheca Philosophica Hermetica 9). 232 pp. Illus. (reprinted 2006)
- Gilles Quispel. Het Evangelie van Thomas. (Pimander. Texts and Studies published by the Bibliotheca Philosophica Hermetica 10). 380 pp. Illus. ISBN 90-71608-15-8 (3rd rev. ed. 2005)
- Johannes van Oort en Gilles Quispel. De Keulse Mani-Codex. (Pimander. Texts and Studies published by the Bibliotheca Philosophica Hermetica 11). 248 pp. Illus., index. ISBN 90-71608-16-6
- Theodor Harmsen. Drink uit deze bron'. Jacques Lefèvre d'Étaples, geïnspireerd humanist en toegewijd tekstbezorger. (Hermesreeks 18-1), 64 pp. 'Drink from this fountain'. Jacques Lefèvre d'Étaples, inspired humanist and dedicated editor. (Hermesreeks 18-2), 64 pp.
- Martine Meuwese (ed.), King Arthur in the Netherlands. (Hermesreeks 19), 71 pp., illus. (2nd ed. 2005)
- Cis van Heertum. Philosophia symbolica. Johann Reuchlin and the Kabbalah. (Hermesreeks 20), 107 pp.
- [Also available as e-book:] Antonin Gadal. Le Triomphe de la Gnose universelle. (Pimander. Texts and Studies published by the Bibliotheca Philosophica Hermetica 12). 232 pp. Illus. ISBN 90-71608-18-2
- [Also available as e-book:] Antonin Gadal. Der Triumph der Universellen Gnosis. (Pimander. Texts and Studies published by the Bibliotheca Philosophica Hermetica 12). 232. pp. Illus. ISBN 90-71608-19-0
- [Also available as e-book:] Antonin Gadal. El Triunfo de la Gnosis Universal. (Pimander. Texts and Studies published by the Bibliotheca Philosophica Hermetica 14). 232 pp. Illus. ISBN 90-71608-21-2
- Roelof van den Broek, Hermes Trismegistus. Inleiding, teksten, commentaren. (Pimander. Texts and Studies published by the Bibliotheca Philosophica Hermetica 15), 366 pp. ISBN 90-71608-220
- Jacob Böhmes Weg in die Welt. Zur Geschichte der Handschriftensammlung, Übersetzungen und Editionen van Abhraham Willemszoon van Beyerland. Red. Theodor Harmsen (Pimander. Texts and Studies published by the Bibliotheca Philosophica Hermetica 16), 450 pp. illus. ISBN 978-3-7728-2446-3 ISBN 978-90-71608-20-9
- Libertas philosophandi. Spinoza als gids voor een vrije wereld. Red. Cis van Heertum (Asclepiusreeks 1), 336 pp. (3rd rev. ed 2009) ISBN 978-90-71608-26-1
- Theodor Harmsen: Der magische Schriftsteller Gustav Meyrink, seine Freunde und sein Werk. Beleuchtet anhand eines Rundgangs durch die Meyrink-Sammlung der Bibliotheca Philosophica Hermetica, Amsterdam, unter Verwendung weiterer Sammlungen. Amsterdam, In de Pelikaan, 2009 ISBN 978-90-71608-25-4
- Puti germes. Obzor vystavok vo Florencii, Benecii i Amsterdame, a teperʹ - v Moskve. (Vert. Anna Moščevitina). Amsterdam, In de Pelikaan, 2008. ISBN 978-90-71608-25-4
- [Also available as e-book:] Helen Wüstefeld & Anne Korteweg. Sleutel tot licht. Getijdenboeken in de Bibliotheca Philosophica Hermetica. (Asclepiusreeks 2), 155 pp., illus. ISBN 978-90-71608-28-5
- [Also available as e-book:] Roelof van den Broek, Gnosis in de Oudheid. (Pimander. Texts and Studies published by the Bibliotheca Philosophica Hermetica 18), 532 pp. Illus. With an index. ISBN 978-90-71608-27-8
- [Also available as e-book:] Cis van Heertum, Alchemie aan de Amstel. Over hermetische geneeskunde | Alchemy on the Amstel. On Hermetic medicine (Hermesreeks 23). 66; 66 pp., illus. ISBN 978-90-71608-00-1
- [Also available as e-book] José Bouman & Cis van Heertum, A curious Tsar: Peter the Great and discovering nature's secrets in Amsterdam (Hermesreeks 24), 59 pp., illus. ISBN 978-90-71608-30-8
- [Also available as e-book:] José Bouman & Cis van Heertum, Beauty as the Imprint of the Cosmos (Hermesreeks 25), 68 pp., illus. ISBN 978-90-71608-31-5
- [Also available as e-book:] José Bouman & Cis van Heertum, Schoonheid als de afdruk van de kosmos (Hermesreeks 26), 68 pp., illus. ISBN 978-90-71608-32-2
- F.A. Janssen et al.: Bibliotheca Philosophica Hermetica. J.R. Ritman Library, Amsterdam. Amsterdam, 1997. Geen ISBN.
- Margaret Lane Ford: Christ, Plato, Hermes Trismegistus. The dawn of printing. Catalogue of the incunabula in the Bibliotheca Philosophica Hermetica. Amsterdam, In de Pelikaan, 1990. 2 vols. ISBN 90-6004-406-1
- (Ed.), Heertum Cis van, and Cis van Heertum. Divine Wisdom, Divine Nature: The Message of the Rosicrucian Manifestoes in the Visual Language of the Seventeenth Century. Bibliotheca Philosophica Hermetica, 2017. ISBN 978-90-71608-34-6
- Bouman, José. Heertum, Cis. Koch, Natalie. Andrews, Corey. The Rosicrucian Revolution: Tradition and Renewal. Amsterdam: In de Pelikaan, 2022. ISBN 978-90-71608-45-2
