= Homomonument =

Memorial in Amsterdam

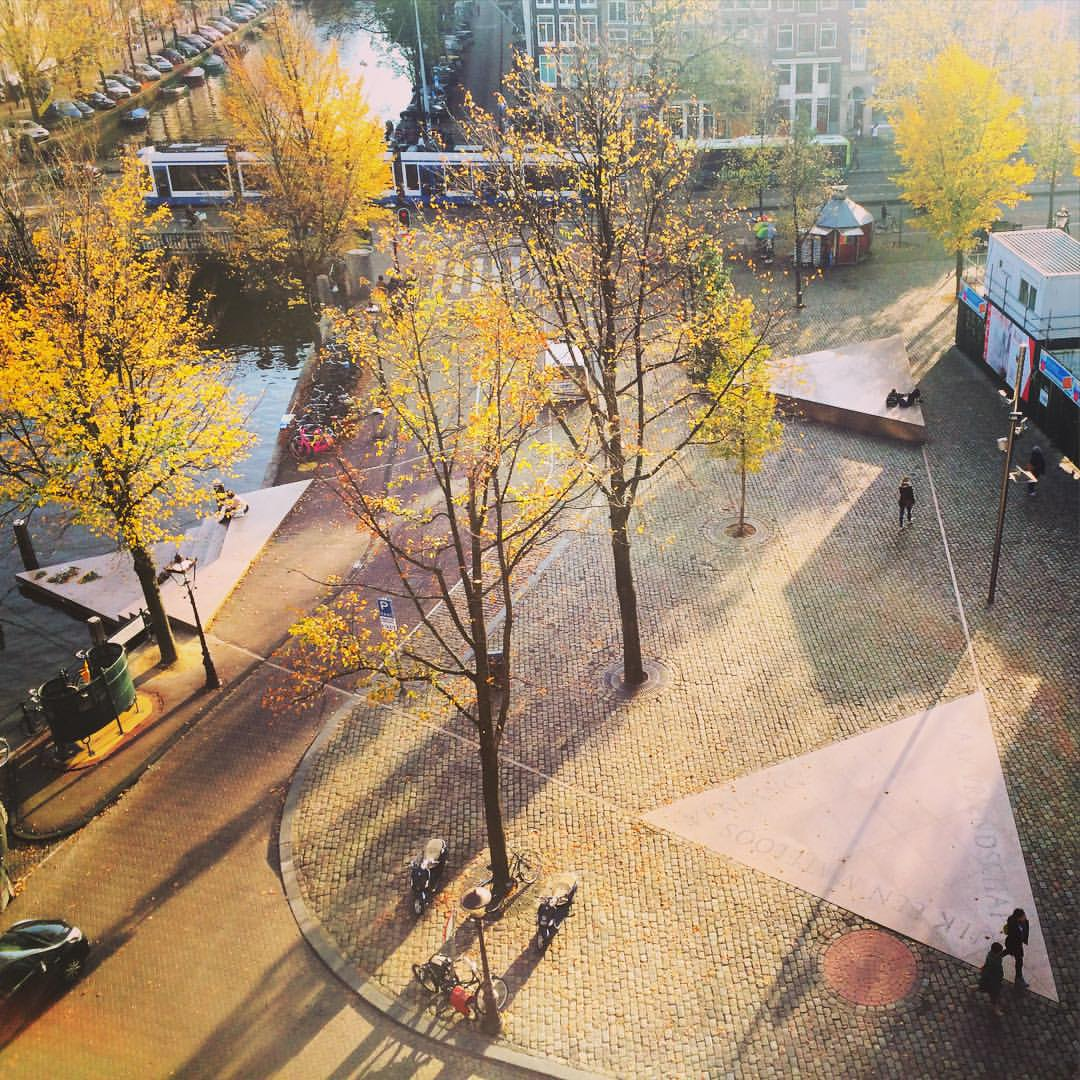
- View from above
- Interactive map of Homomonument
- Location: Amsterdam, Netherlands
- Coordinates: 52°22′28″N 04°53′05.5″E
- Designer: Karin Daan
- Material: granite
- Completion date: 5 September 1987

The Homomonument is a memorial in the centre of Amsterdam, the capital of the Netherlands. It commemorates all LGBTQ people who have been persecuted because of their sexual orientation. Opened on 5 September 1987, it was the first monument in the world to commemorate gays and lesbians who were killed by the German Nazi regime.

The monument takes the form of three large pink triangles made of granite, set into the ground, which together compose a larger triangle. It is located on the bank of the Keizersgracht canal, near the historic Westerkerk church. The Homomonument was designed to "inspire and support lesbians and gays in their struggle against denial, oppression and discrimination."

During the Netherlands' annual Remembrance Day ceremony on 4 May, wreaths are laid on the monument to commemorate LGBT victims of persecution. A day later, on Liberation Day, the monument becomes the site of a street party.

== Symbolism ==
The Homomonument is an abstract composition of three pink triangles made of granite. The symbol has historical roots; the pink triangle was a cloth badge used in Nazi concentration camps to identify men who had been jailed for homosexuality, which also included bisexual men and transgender women. It is estimated that 100,000 men were arrested and half of these spent time imprisoned during Nazi rule. Subsequently, the pink triangle became a symbol of the emancipation of the LGBTQ+ community and its struggle for its rights. The Homomonument commemorates all homosexual men and women who have been persecuted and murdered, including in World War II, as well as honouring all those who have fought for the freedom and human rights of LGBTQ+ members.

The designer of the monument, artist Karin Daan, described the symbolism of the monument as follows:

I think the best part is that the monument integrates itself into the place like an embroidery, and from above it is clearly visible how the triangle is intertwined with the urban and social space, that, for example, when taxi drivers stand in the middle of the monument, they are hardly aware of it. I think that is the most beautiful component of the Homomonument: we are there, proud and strong as granite, the monument binds us together here and now, but we are just as intertwined with the city and society in a larger time and space.

== History ==
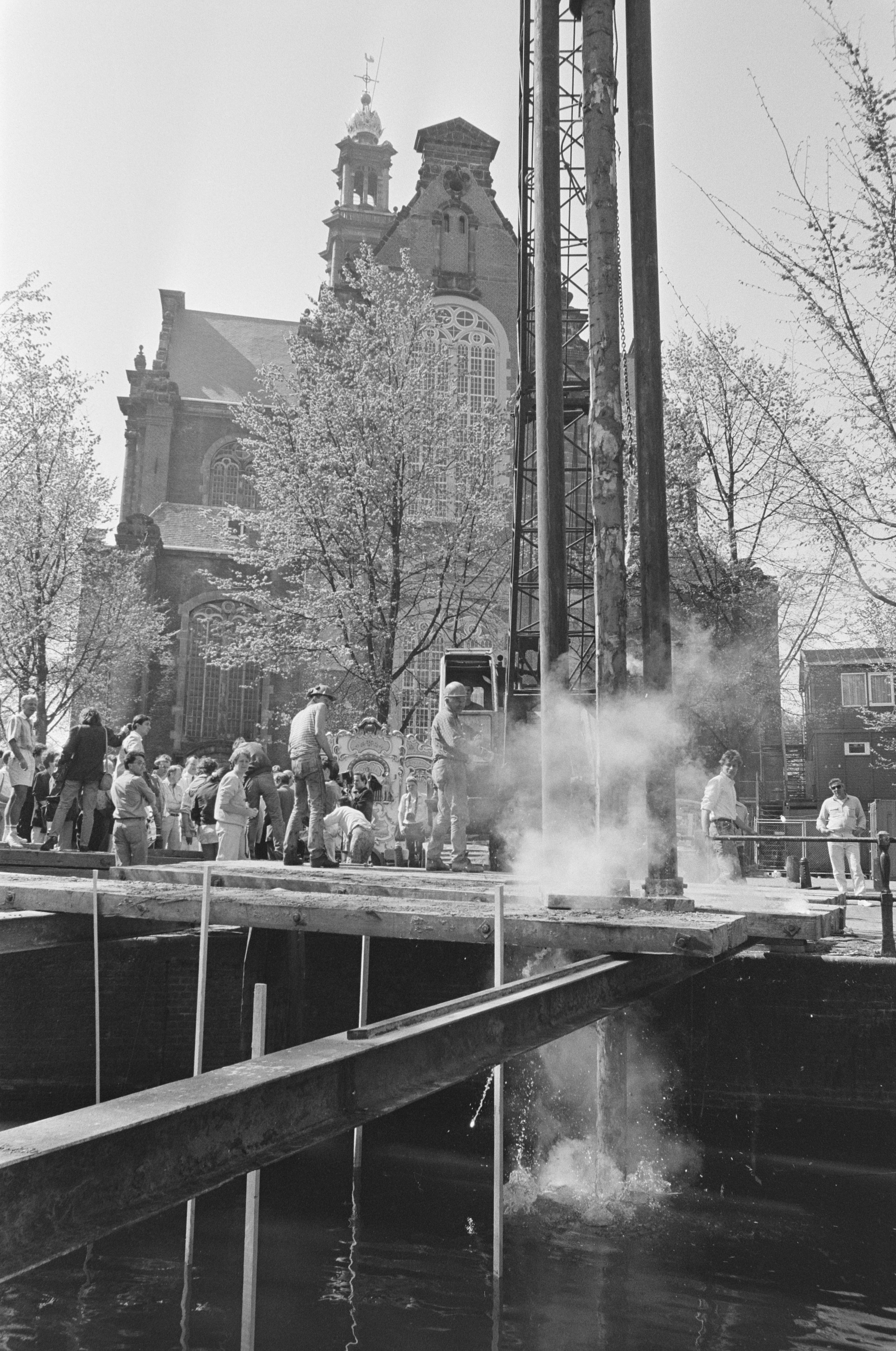
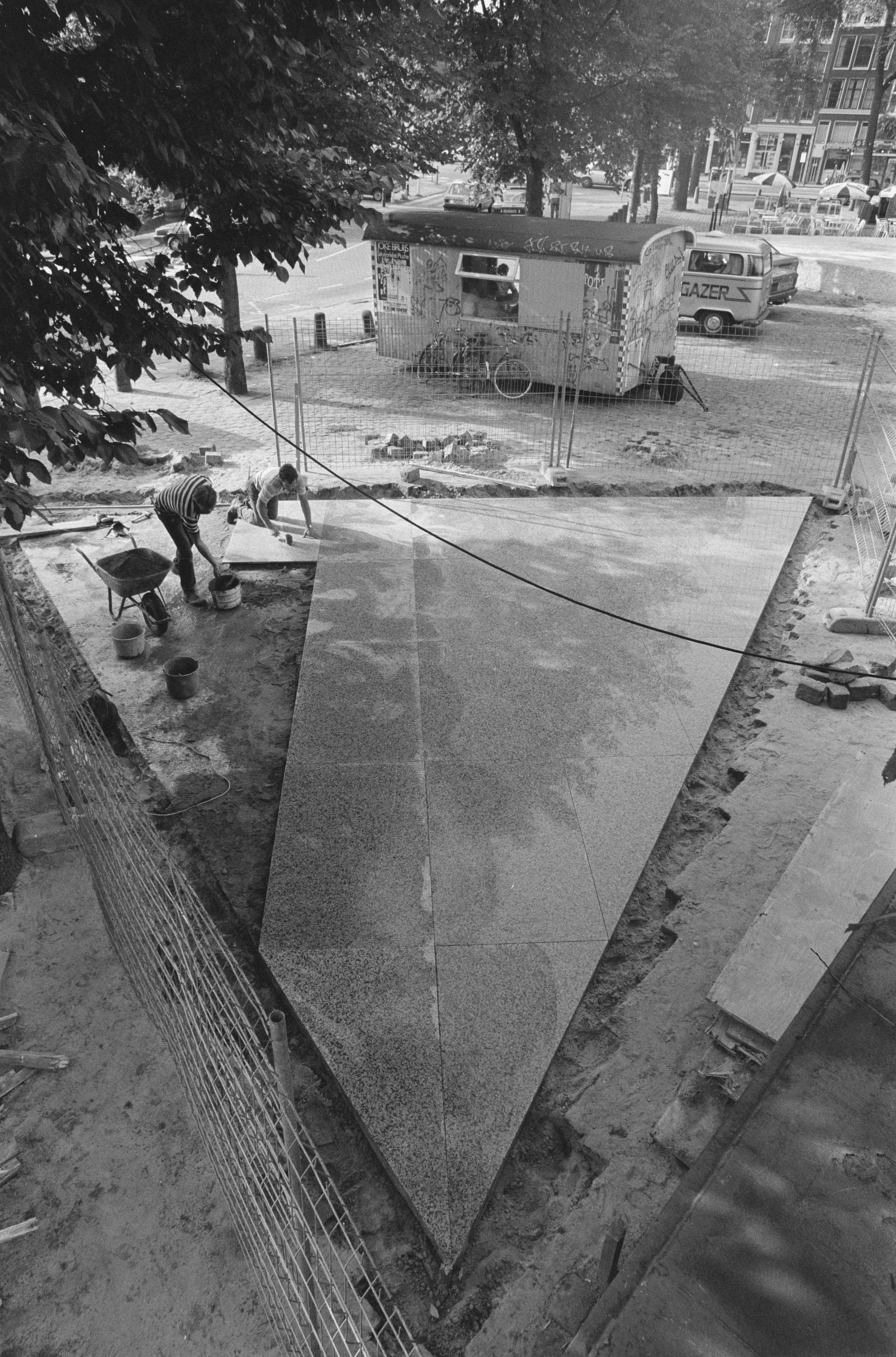
Construction of the Homomonument. 1987

The idea of perpetuating the memory of homosexual victims of World War II appeared at the very beginning of the organized Dutch gay movement. In 1961, activist Jef Last suggested a 'monument to the unknown gay': "No one knows how many there were, no statistics indicate how many of them were beaten to death in those camps or starved or otherwise succumbed. No flame burns for unknown homophiles". However, this idea was not further developed until the 1970s, when the visibility and openness of the marginalized and stigmatized gay community became important political goals for many gay rights organizations.

In 1970, a year before the complete decriminalization of homosexuality in the Netherlands, a group of gay activists were arrested for trying to lay a wreath at the National Monument to the Victims of World War II on Dam Square, Amsterdam. The flowers were removed from the memorial by the police and declared insulting to the memory of the dead. This incident angered the LGBT community and catalyzed the struggle for the recognition of victims of repression. Throughout the 1970s, similar wreath-placing demonstrations were executed with varying success, as activists pushed for the inclusion of homosexuals in the public's collective memory of Hitler's "social purification" campaigns.

In the spring of 1979, during a period of rapid growth of the gay rights movement, the initiative to build a monument to persecuted homosexuals entered a qualitatively new stage when the Homomonument Foundation was founded. Its main goal was the implementation of the memorial project. One of the founders of the fund was Pacifist Socialist Party member Bob van Schijndel. Pointing to the fact that a monument to the Romani victims of the Nazi genocide was opened in Amsterdam in 1978, van Schijndel proposed a similar memorial which would be dedicated to the homosexuals who suffered during the Nazi rule. The founders of the fund also included representatives of the Labour Party, the People's Party and the Christian Democratic Party of the Netherlands.

In 1980, artists were invited to submit designs and a jury was assembled consisting of experts in the fields of art and design. The following year, out of 137 designs submitted to the competition, the jury chose the design by Karin Daan. With the triangle on the water as its central point, Daan expanded the design to make her work as monumental as possible without disrupting its surroundings. The government of Amsterdam allocated a place for the erection of the monument, but construction did not begin for another seven years. Many organizations and individuals made donations for the monument, with individual contributions from the Dutch Parliament, the government of Ruud Lubbers, the city of Amsterdam and the province of North Holland.

The idea of creating a monument was pointedly criticized by a number of political and public figures, who either did not recognize the fact of repression, considering the persecution of homosexuals to be legal, or argued that the creation of a monument to a separate small group was unjustifiable. Former Foreign Minister of the Netherlands Joseph Luns compared homosexuals to kleptomaniacs. In opposition to him, supporters of the monument noted that its construction would not make sense if there were no people in society who caused suffering to gays and lesbians, complicating their lives. The Daan design also drew criticism from some gay activists, who wanted the monument to have a more imposing design.

The first stone was laid on 28 April 1987, at Westermarkt. The opening ceremony of the Homomonument took place on 5 September 1987. It became the first gay monument of its kind in the world. Because of this, the Netherlands became known as the most tolerant Western nation, since the act of erecting a monument meant the recognition of the injustice of the past.

== Construction ==
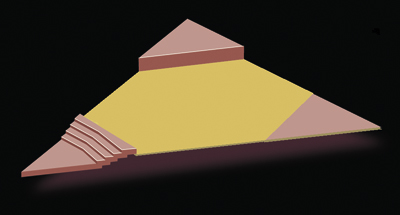
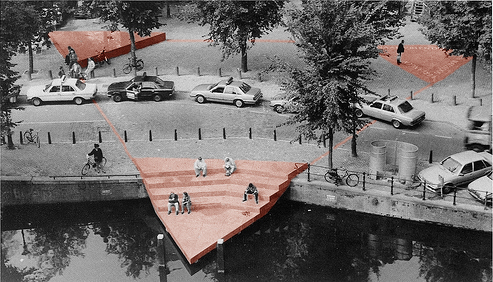
Structure diagram

The Homomonument was erected on the Westermarkt square on the banks of the Keizersgracht canal, near the historic Westerkerk church. The memorial is a composition of three equilateral triangles of pink granite with edge lengths of 10 meters, which are interconnected by thin lines of similar material, thus forming one large equilateral triangle with a side length of 36 meters. Karin Daan designed the monument to be as imposing as possible without disturbing the environment, fitting it as closely as possible into the historic urban landscape.

The Homomonument embodies three ideas and three times: the memory of the past, opposition to discrimination and repression in the present, and parting words for the future. The first triangle is located on the embankment of the Keizersgracht canal. Four gradually tapering steps broken in the centre lead down from the pavement to a platform resting on the water. The top of the triangle, projecting into the canal, points to Dam Square, where the National Monument to the Victims of World War II is located. Four pontoons protect the monument from possible damage by passing ships. This triangle symbolizes the present time. Here people can often be seen sitting on the steps, and on the platform resting near the water, flowers are regularly laid and candles are lit.

The second triangle is made in the form of a podium, rising 60 centimetres above the surface of the square. It symbolizes the future. The outward-facing peak points to the headquarters of the LGBT organization "COC" at Rosenstraat 14. The abbreviation "COC" originally stood for "Cultuur en Ontspannings-Centrum" (with nid. – "Centre for culture and recreation") and was conceived as a neutral-sounding front for an LGBT organization. Founded in 1946, it is the oldest LGBT organization in the world. Near the triangle, there is an information kiosk called "Pink Point", which sells literature and souvenirs related to the gay life of the Netherlands. The podium itself is often used as a stage for various events.

The third triangle is located flush with the paving stones of the square. It symbolizes the past. Around the perimeter of the slab is engraved a line from the poem "To the Young Fisherman" by the Dutch Jewish poet Jacob Israël de Haan, who was allegedly homosexual: "Such a boundless craving for friendship" (Dutch: Naar Vriendschap Zulk een Mateloos Verlangen), which, according to the plan of Karin Daan, describes the driving force in relationships between people. The apex, outside the large triangle, points to the home of Anne Frank, a Jewish girl whose diaries written during the German occupation of the Netherlands combined millions of human tragedies associated with the Nazi genocide in the story of one child.

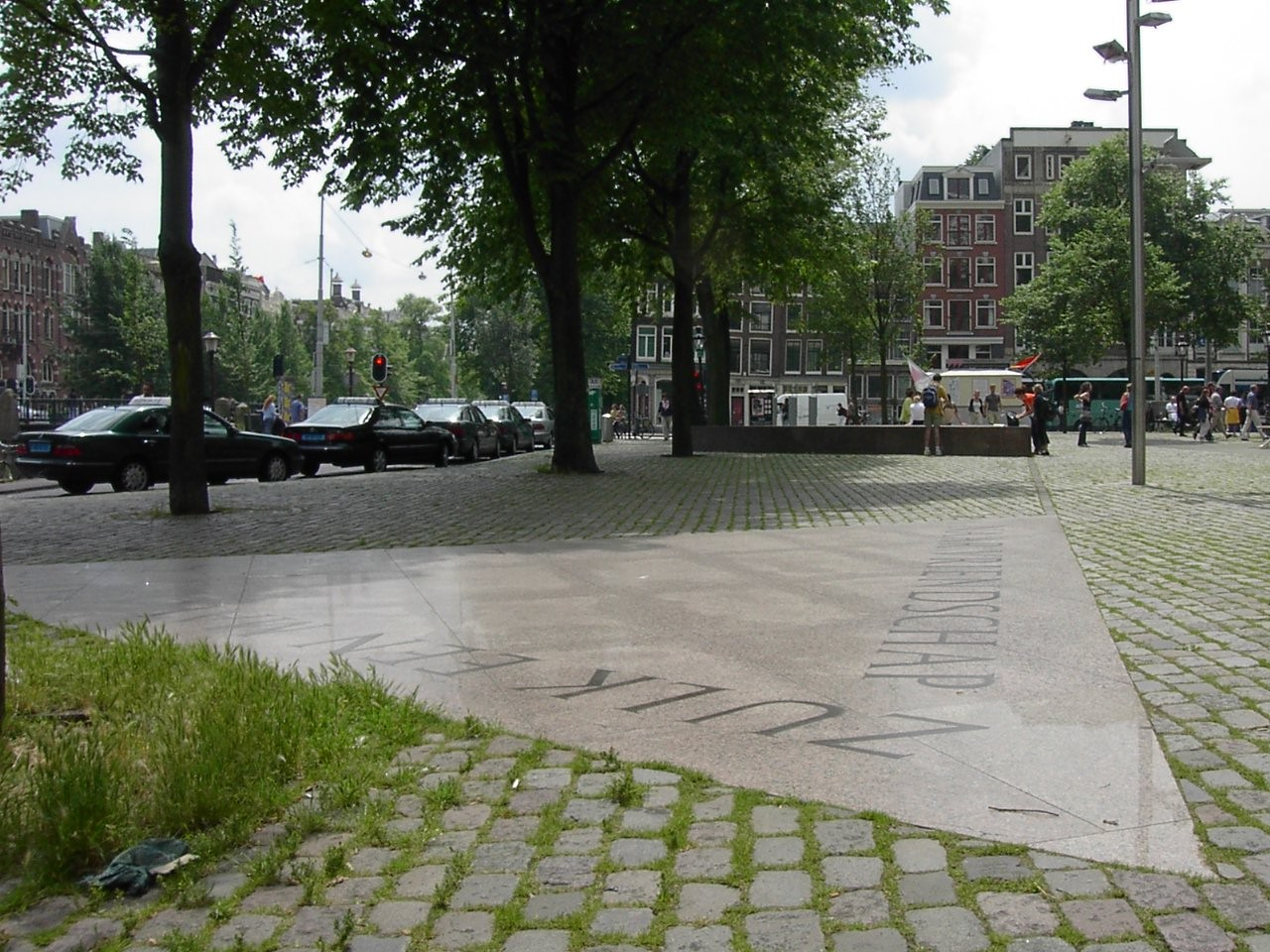
Triangle of the past

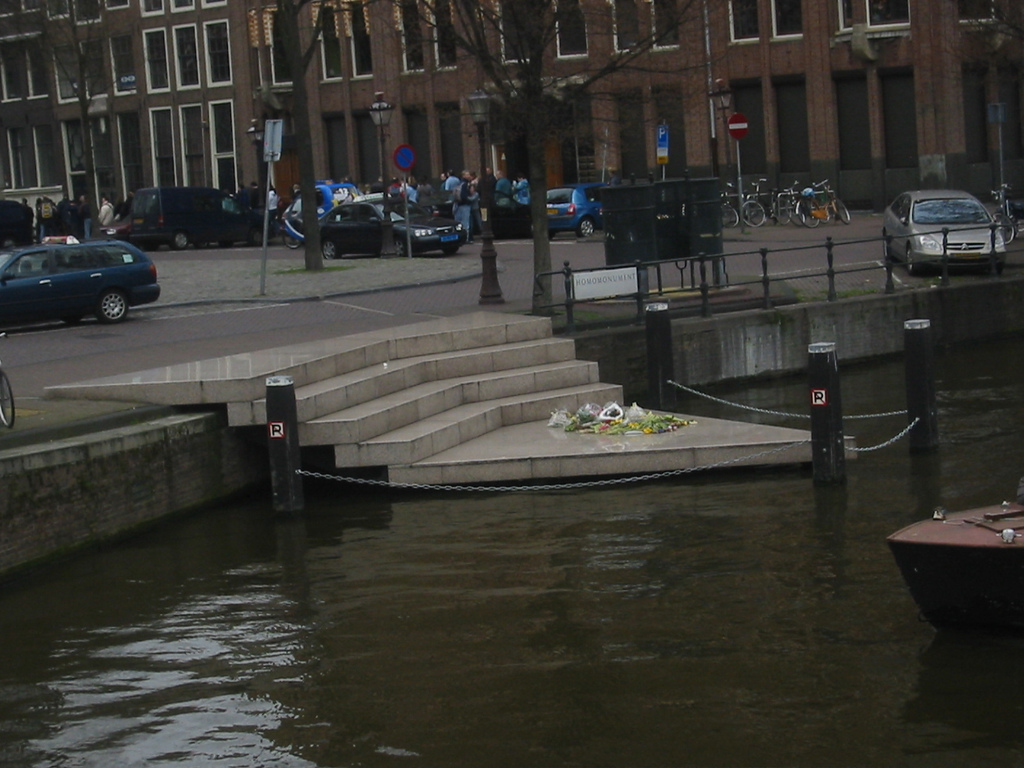
Triangle of the present

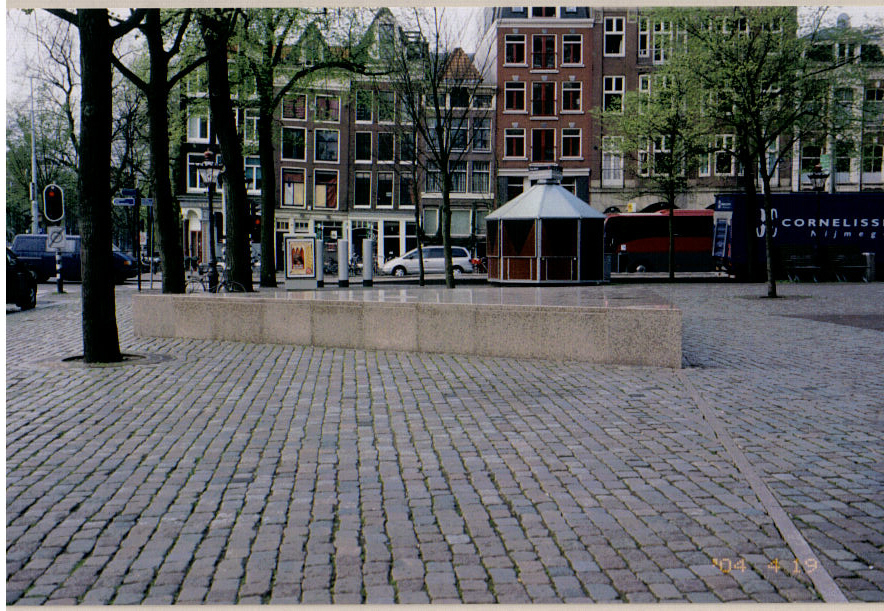
Triangle of the future

The three historical sites which the monument points to were chosen to further emphasize the context in which the memorial itself and its symbols exist. The plate, placed on the canal fence on both sides (so that it can be seen both from land and from the water), contains an inscription in three languages (Dutch, English and French):

Homomonument Commemorates all women and men ever oppressed and persecuted because of their homosexuality.

Supports the International Lesbian and Gay Movement in their struggle against contempt, discrimination and oppression. Demonstrates that we are not alone. Calls for permanent vigilance.

Past, present and future are represented by the 3 triangles on this square. Designed by Karin Daan, 1987.

In 1991, the bridge over the Keizersgracht canal, located north of the Homomonument, was renamed in honour of the anti-fascist, resistance fighter, gay activist, and long-term leader of the COC Niek Engelschman.

== Current situation ==
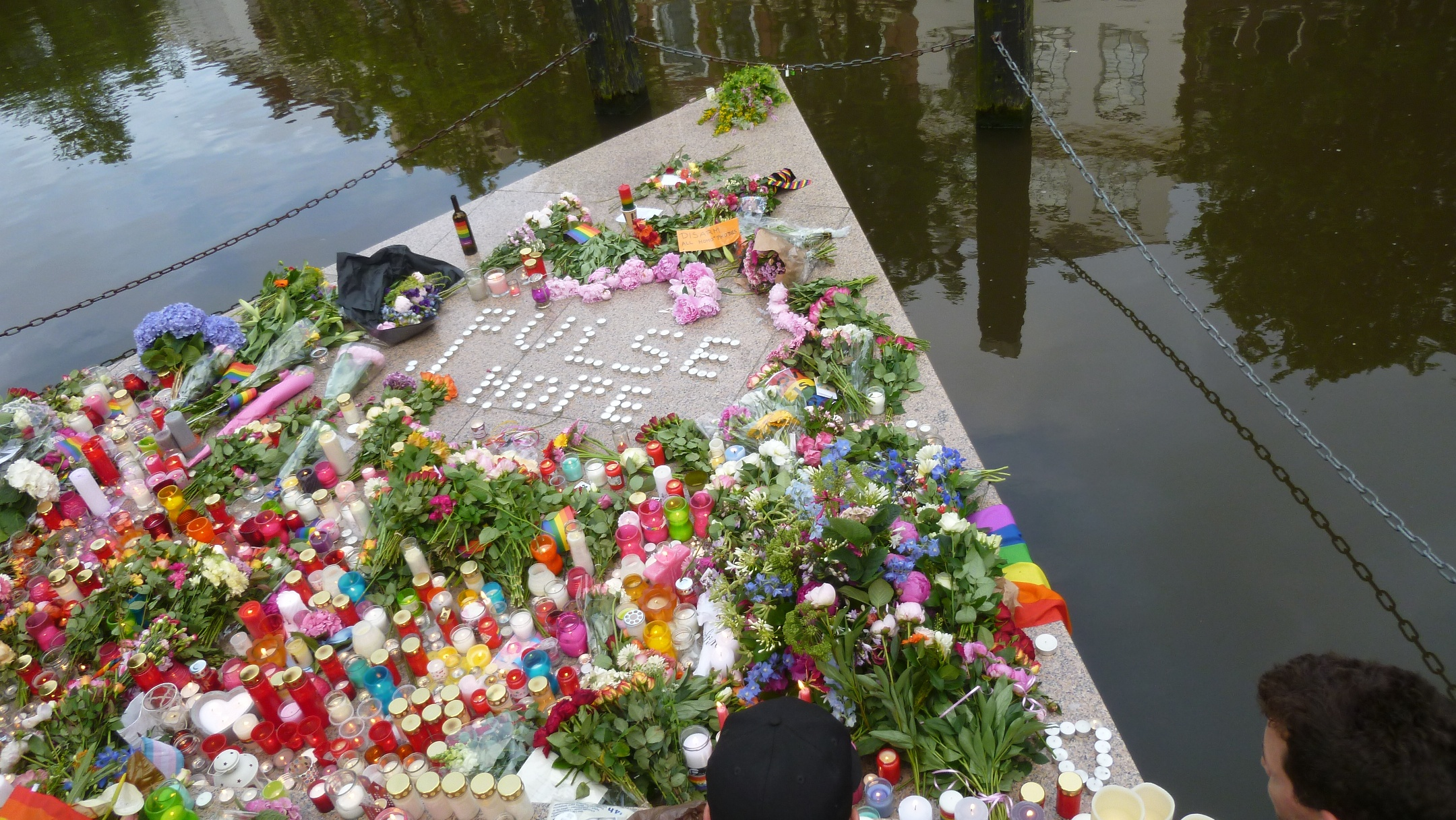
Memorial to victims of the Orlando nightclub shooting on Homomonument. June 2016.

Every year, on the National Day of Remembrance on 4 May, the Homomonument hosts an official ceremony to commemorate the gays and lesbians who were victims of Nazi repression, as well as those who are still being persecuted for their sexual orientation around the world. The event, which brings together hundreds of people, is attended by various officials, representatives of political parties, and public organizations, many of whom make speeches. The ceremony begins at 8 pm and includes the laying of flowers, the lowering of the Dutch flag, and the traditional two minutes of silence followed by the national anthem "Wilhelmus". Previously, the use of official paraphernalia was prohibited, but this position was later changed.

On the King's Day on 27 April and Liberation Day on 5 May, colourful Pink Triangle festivals are held at Westermarkt, which include dances, concerts, performances by artists, drag queens, and so on. These festivities, according to the organizers, should testify to the connection between the past and the present and be a guarantee that history will not be forgotten and will not lose its relevance.

The Homomonument, as the first monument of its kind, has gained worldwide fame and is a popular tourist attraction in Amsterdam. People from all over the world come to it to lay flowers and take pictures.

The Homomonument underwent restoration in 2003. On 24 October 2006, the mayor of Amsterdam, Job Cohen, and the chairman of the LGBT organization COC, Frank van Dalen, inaugurated a model Homomonument in the Madurodam miniature park in The Hague. Another monument in memory of LGBT victims of repression and persecution was dedicated in Barcelona, Spain in 2011, which was modeled after the Homomonument.

Today, the Westermarkt has become one of the centres of life for the Dutch LGBT community. Various events are often held here, including rallies, photo exhibitions, flash mobs, open lectures, weddings, celebrations, and other events. The Homomonument Foundation coordinates and funds these events.

== Literature ==
- Whisnant, Clayton J. (2016). Queer Identities and Politics in Germany: A History, 1880–1945. Columbia University Press. ISBN 978-1-939594-10-5.
- Bartels, Thijs (2003). Dansen op het homomonument [Dancing on the Homomonument] (in Dutch). Amsterdam: Shorer Books. ISBN 978-90-73341-17-3.
- Koenders, Pieter (1987). The Homomonument. Amsterdam: Stichting Homomonument. ISBN 978-90-90-01755-6.
- Bouhuys, Mies (1995). Om nooit te vergeten: Amsterdamse monumenten en gedenktekens ter herinnering aan de Tweede Wereldoorlog [Never to forget: Amsterdam monuments and memorials in memory of the Second World War] (in Dutch). Bussum: Uitgeverij Thoth. ISBN 978-90-6868-124-6.
