= Keizersgracht =

Canal in Amsterdam, Netherlands

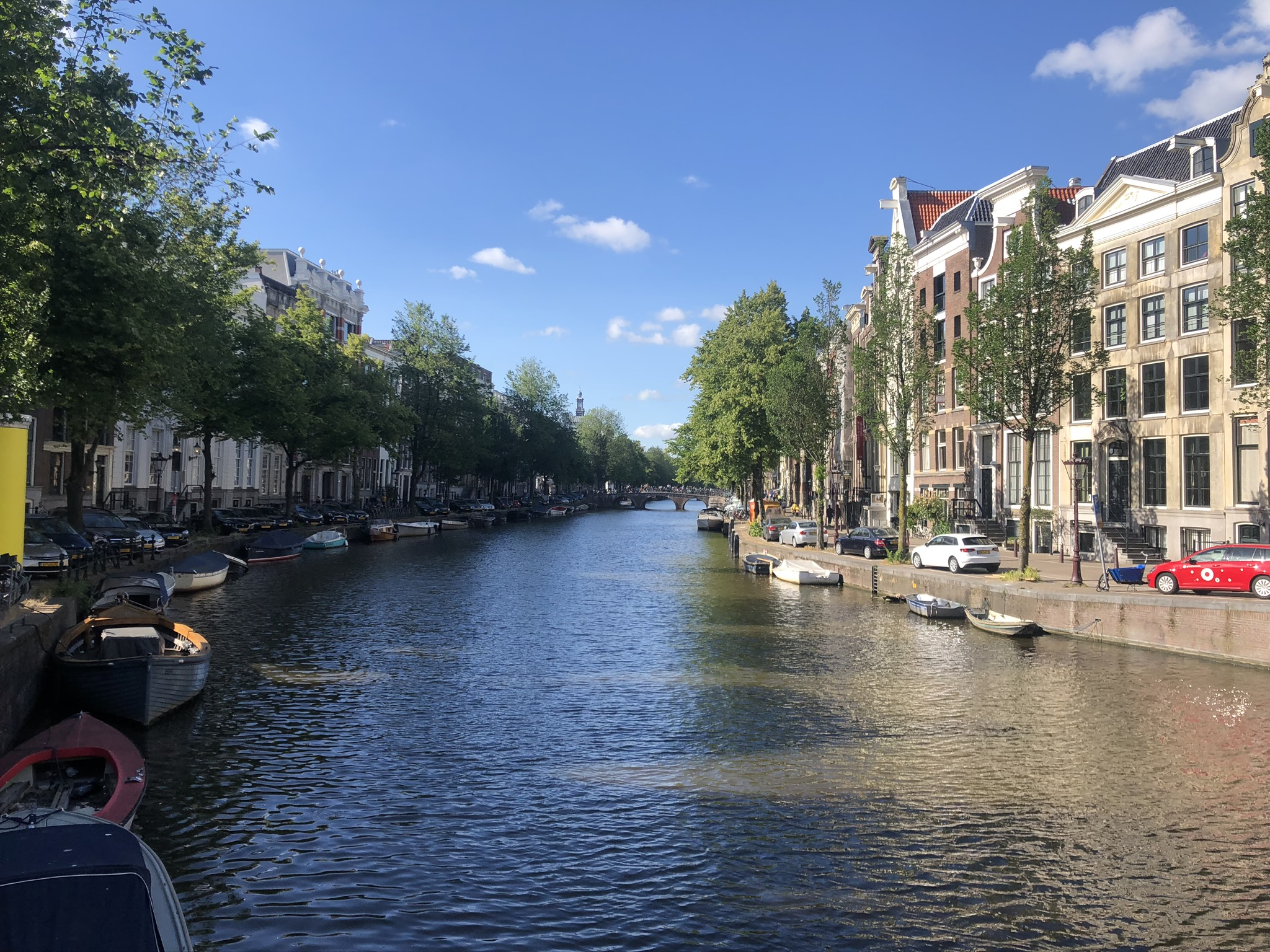
- Huidenstraat - Runstraat bridge over Keizersgracht, Negen Straatjes, July 2019

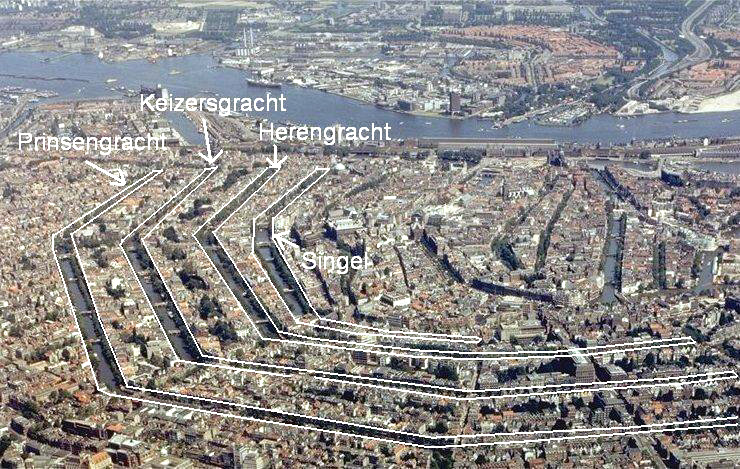
- Keizersgracht is between the outer Prinsengracht and the inner Herengracht and Singel
- Length: 2.8 kilometres (1.7 mi)
- Location: Amsterdam
- Postal code: 1015, 1016, 1017
- Northwest end: Brouwersgracht
- To: Amstel

Construction
- Construction start: 17th century

The Keizersgracht (Dutch pronunciation: [ˈkɛizərsˌxrɑxt]; "Emperor's canal") is a canal in Amsterdam, the Netherlands. It is the second of the three main Amsterdam canals that together form the Grachtengordel, or canal belt, and lies between the inner Herengracht and outer Prinsengracht.

== History ==
The first part of the Keizersgracht, between Brouwersgracht and (approximately) the current Leidsegracht, was dug in the summer of 1615 at the initiative of mayor Frans Hendricksz Oetgens, city carpenter Hendrick Jacobsz Staets and city surveyor Lucas Jansz Sinck. The Keizersgracht was named after Maximilian I, Holy Roman Emperor. It is the widest canal in the center of Amsterdam, namely one hundred Amsterdam feet, that is 28.31 metres (92.9 ft). The Keizersgracht is the second of the three main canals to have been dug; the Prinsengracht was dug in 1614.

In September 1614 there arose an intention to turn the Keizersgracht into a chic boulevard without water, following the example of Lange Voorhout in The Hague. This idea was abandoned for a number of reasons. It was expected that the future buyers of lots on the Keizersgracht would want to be able to reach their home or warehouse by boat. Other considerations may have been the need for water storage, the easier supply of building and raising material, but especially the shortage of infill material. The construction of the fortifications at the same time also required a lot of infill material.

The allotment on the east side was completed in November 1615. The plots were given the same width, 30 feet, as on the Herengracht. The buildings went up quickly; by 1618 hardly any vacant lots remained.

The section between the Leidsegracht and the Amstel belongs to the fourth Amsterdam expansion of 1658. The actual digging of this part of the Keizersgracht began in 1663. In 1667 both parts of the Keizersgracht were connected to each other. The section between the Amstel and the Plantage Muidergracht was laid last. This part was named Nieuwe Keizersgracht. During the second phase in 1663, city architect Daniël Stalpaert devised an additional street between Keizersgracht and Prinsengracht, the Kerkstraat, in order to provide the canal houses with a back entrance where they could build a coach house.

In 1949 the municipality had all the trees on the canal cut down due to the elm disease, after which linden trees were planted.

== Architecture and monuments ==
There are many monuments and monumental canal houses on the Keizersgracht, including:

=== Even numbers ===
102: Rode Hoed (Vrijburg), from 1630
220: Church of Our Lady, from 1854
224: Saxenburg, renewed after 1755
242–252: Groote Keijser, built between 1620 and 1730
324: Felix Meritis, from 1787
334–346: De Claes Reinierszhofje, from 1618
384: The Dylan Hotel, formerly Roman Catholic Poor's Office and before that the first Theatre of Van Campen (1637–1664)
566: Keizersgrachtkerk, from 1888
672–674: The Van Raey Houses, now Museum Van Loon, from 1671
676: The Nieuwe Waalse Kerk, Keizersgracht 676, from 1856

=== Odd numbers ===
105: d'Bruynvis, from 1763
123: Huis met de Hoofden, from 1622
141: South Africa House
143: Keizersgracht 143, historic canal house
177: Coymanshuis, by architect Jacob van Campen, from 1625
209: De Hoop, from 1734, restored in 2001
225: The Koopermoole, from 1746
401: Huis Marseille, from 1665, the first photography museum in The Netherlands
609: Foam Fotografiemuseum Amsterdam
633: Museum Geelvinck-Hinlopen
745: ING Bank

A number of buildings were built by the Amsterdam architects Philips Vingboons (1607–1678) and Adriaan Dortsman (1635–1682).

The Homomonument on the Westermarkt is in part, in the form of a jetty, above the Keizersgracht.

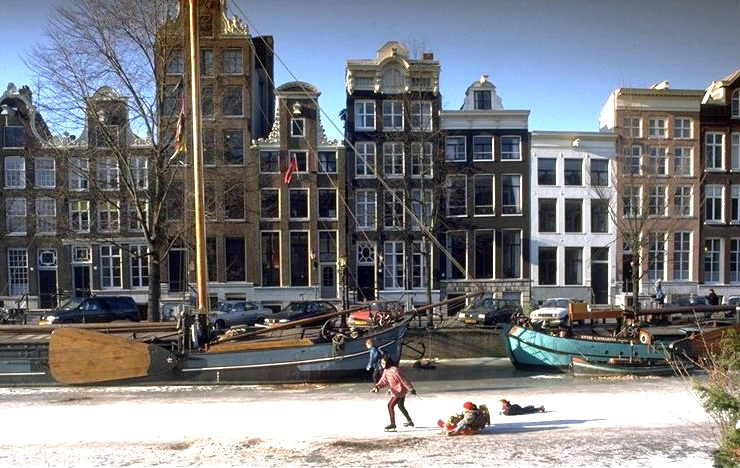
Keizersgracht 54–62, with ice fun on the frozen canal

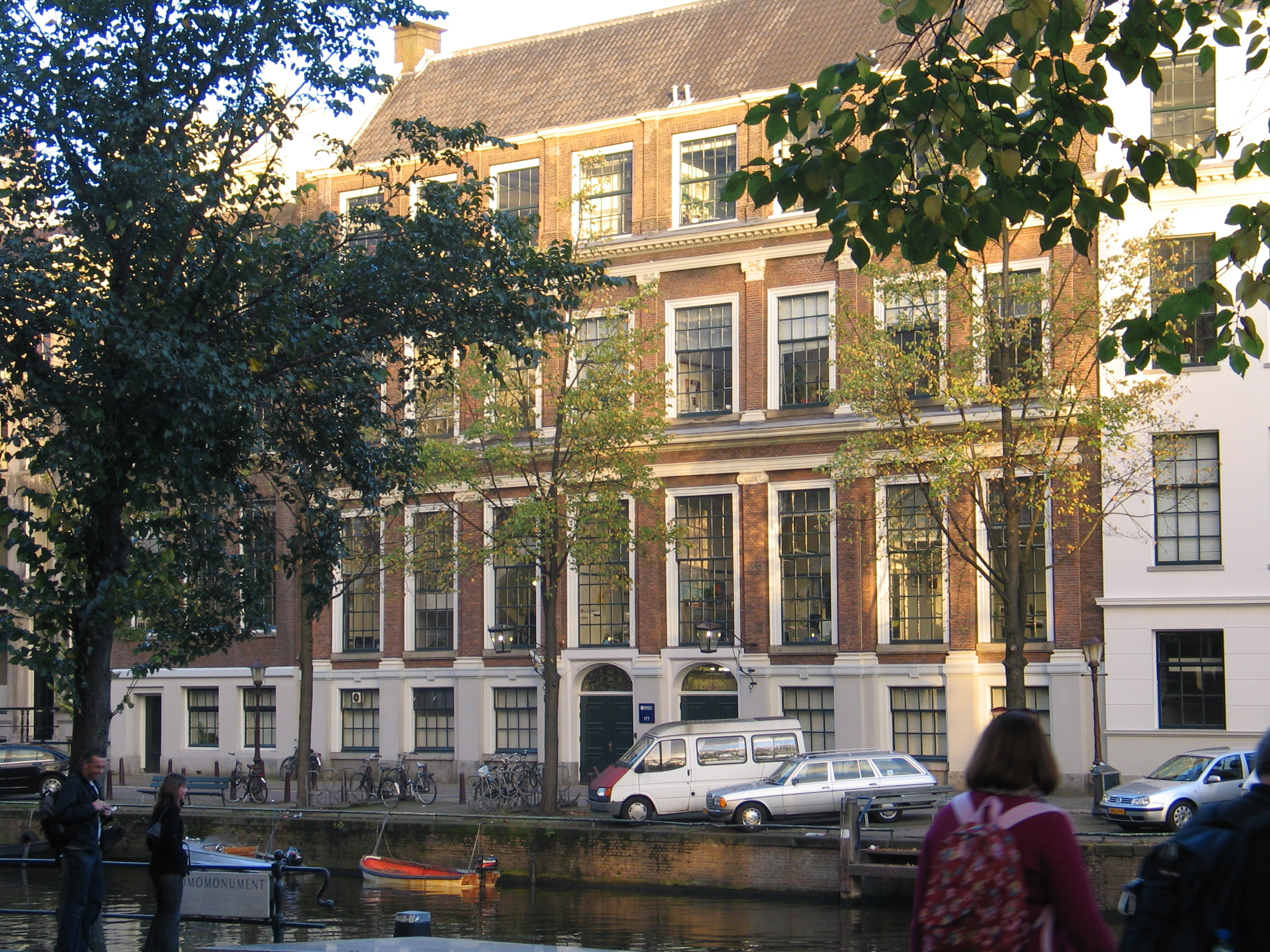
Keizersgracht 177, the Coymans houses in 2008

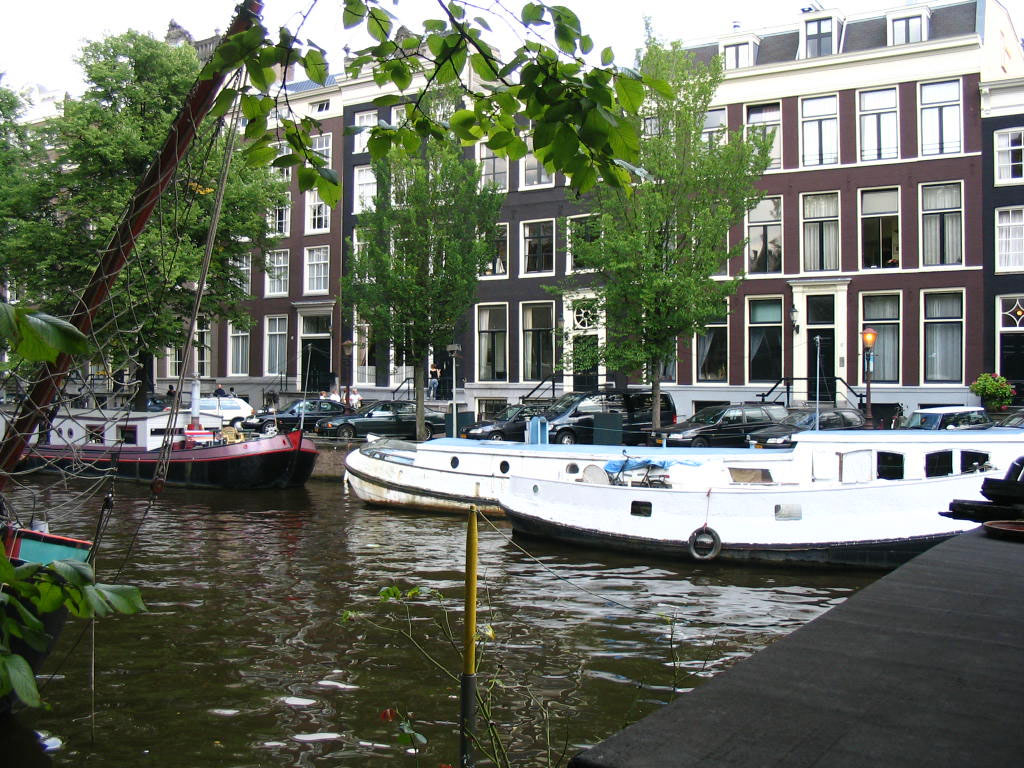
Keizersgracht 85–87

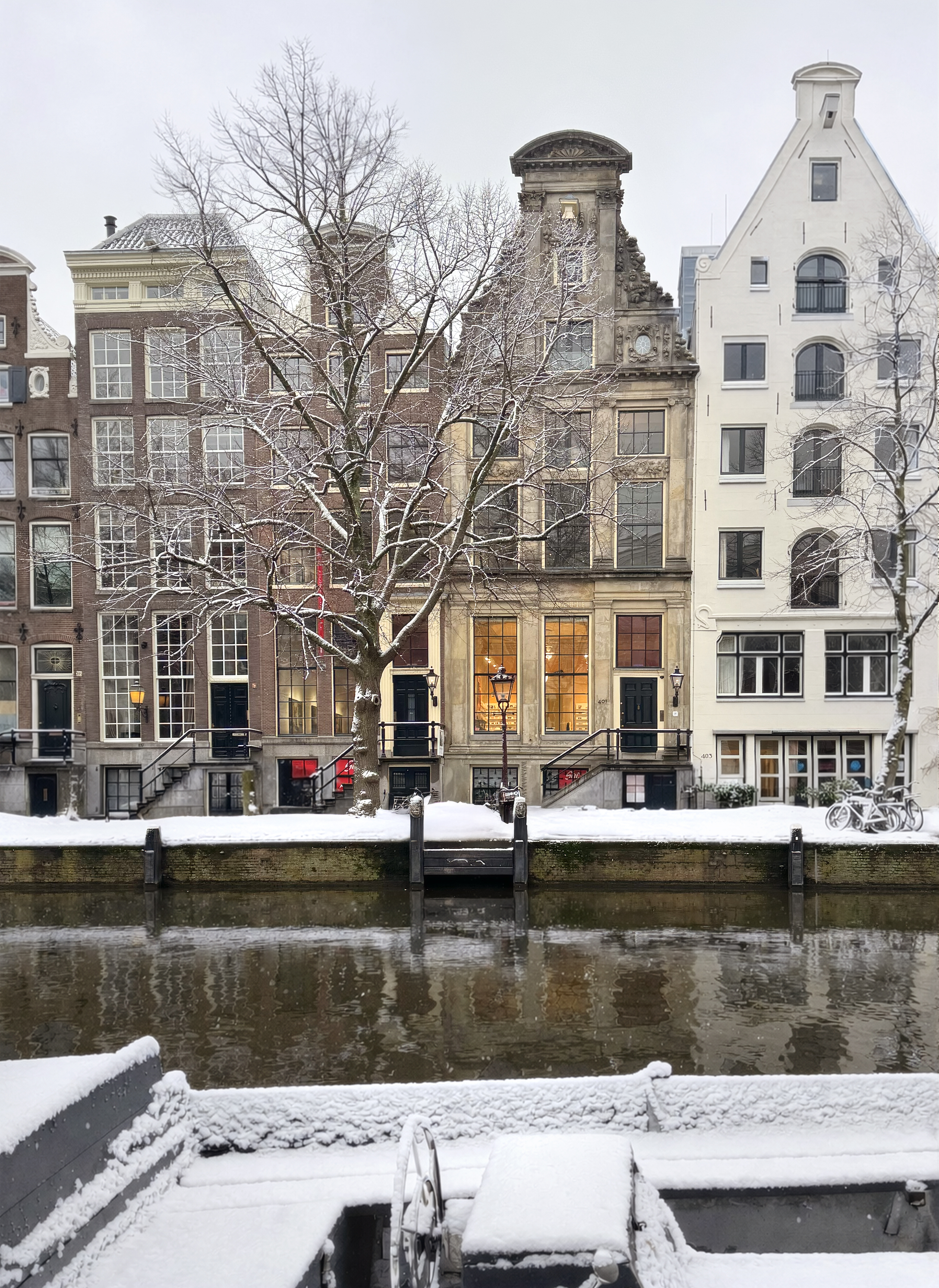
Huis Marseille, Museum for Photography, Keizersgracht 401

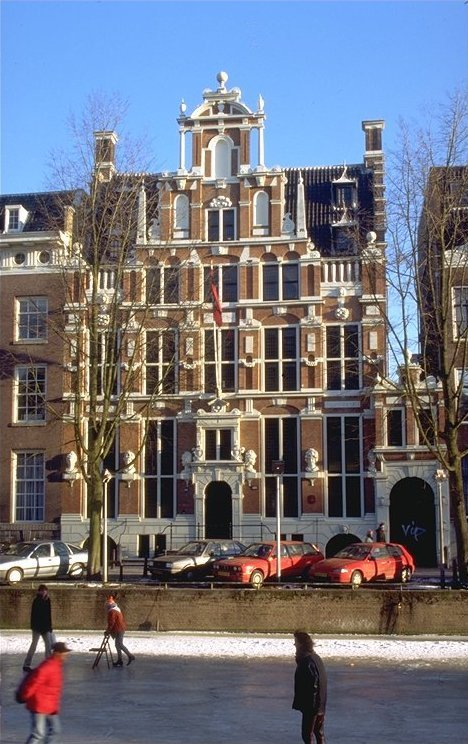
Huis met de Hoofden, Keizersgracht 123

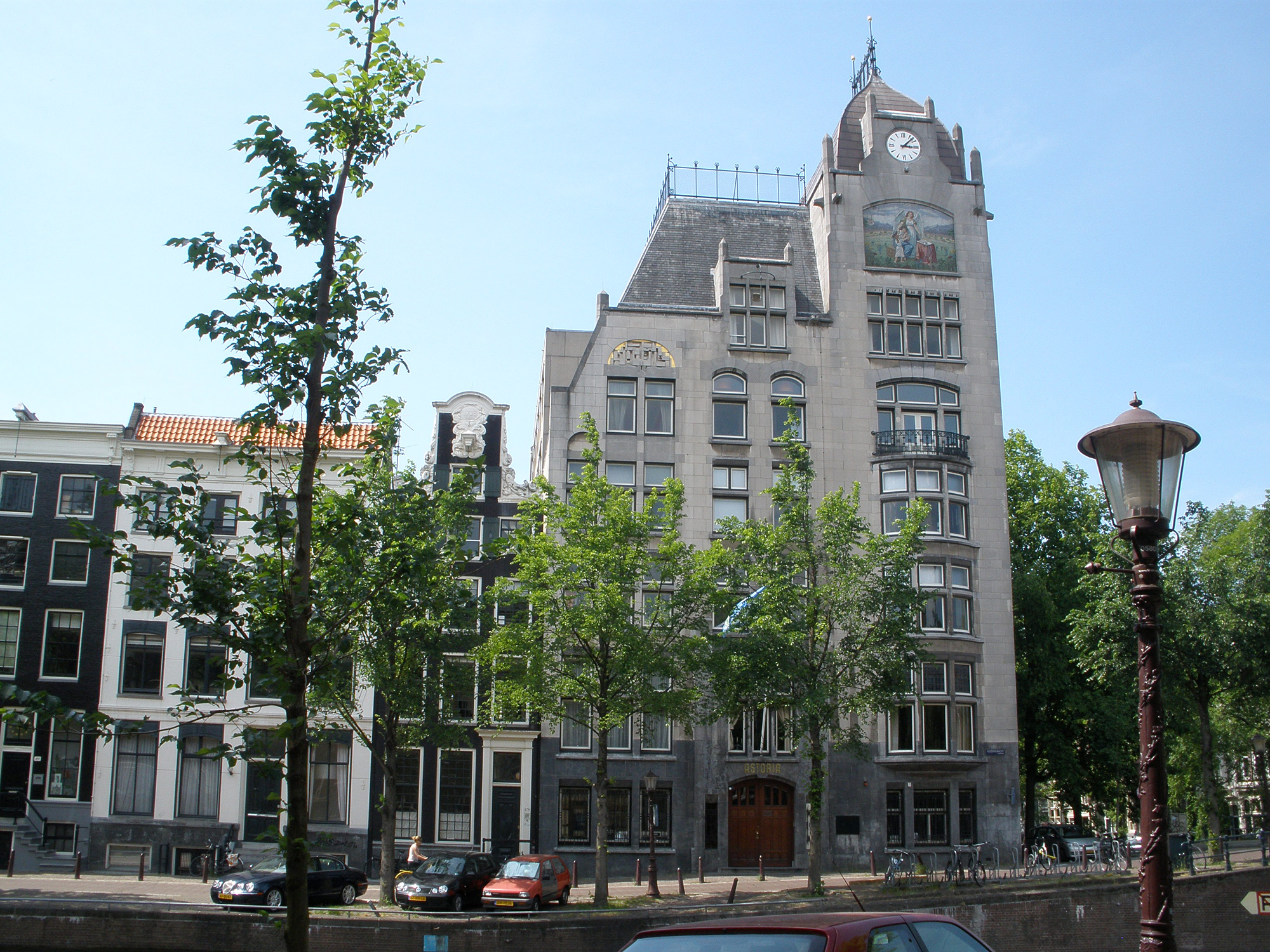
Astoria building, Keizersgracht 174–176

== Numbering and orientation ==
The Keizersgracht starts in the north at the Brouwersgracht, bends parallel between Herengracht and the Prinsengracht to the southeast and flows into the Amstel. The odd-numbered side of the canal is on the side of the heart of the city (Dam Square).

At Keizersgracht 200 and 183 is the intersection with Westermarkt and Raadhuisstraat
At Keizersgracht 508 and 455 is the intersection with Leidsestraat
At Keizersgracht 648 and 589 is the intersection with Vijzelstraat
At Keizersgracht 764 and 709 is the intersection with Utrechtsestraat
At Keizersgracht 826 and 765, the canal flows into the Amstel

== Bridges ==
The Keizersgracht is spanned by 14 bridges, all fixed.

Number	Name	Street	Canal width	Canal Clearance	Clearance at 4m width	Managed by
55	Pastoorsbrug	Brouwersgracht	7,00	2,22	1,80	Centrum
54	Noordsche Compagniebrug	Herenstraat	6,81	1,80		Centrum
51		Leliegracht	6,70	2,27	1,80	Centrum
106	Niek Engelschmanbrug	Westermarkt	2x7,00	1,70		DiVV
49	Kees Fensbrug	Hartenstraat	6,70	2,27	1,80	Centrum
48	(Felix Meritisbrug)	Wolvenstraat	6,70	2,27	1,80	Centrum
47		Huidenstraat	6,70	2,27	1,80	Centrum
46	(Quellijnbrug)	Leidsegracht	6,70	2,27	1,80	Centrum
43		Leidsestraat	6,70	1,77		DiVV
42	(Wielrijdersbrug)	Nieuwe Spiegelstraat	6,70	2,27	1,80	Centrum
41	Johanna Borskibrug	Vijzelstraat	6,88	1,80		DiVV
38	(Oetgenssluis)	Reguliersgracht	6,80	2,38	1,84	Centrum
37	(Peylsluis)	Utrechtsestraat	6,83	1,24		DiVV
36	Lucas Jansz Sinckbrug	Amstel	5,14	2,89	2,42	Centrum

The bridge names in parentheses are the unofficial names of bridges, names which have lapsed since April 2016.

With the passage heights in the above table, take into account the fact that the Keizersgracht, like all other canals in the city center, is 0.40 metres (1 ft 4 in) below the Amsterdam Ordnance Datum.

== Skating ==
If ice forms in winter, there is a possibility of skating on the Amsterdam canals. Waternet will stop circulation of water in the canals by closing the locks, and boats will be prohibited from sailing on a number of canals, including the Keizersgracht. The Keizersgracht is then designated as the main canal for skating. In 2008 a tour boat from shipping company Meyers broke to pieces against the rules in the very first layer of ice; questions about this were asked to the city center district board.

The Keizersrace is a sprint race that is held between the Leidsestraat and the Spiegelgracht. The winner of the race may call himself/herself the Keizer(in) of Amsterdam. The race was held in 1991, 1996, 1997, and 2012.

== Tunnel ==
The so-called Poentunnel was opened below the Keizersgracht in 1974, an underground walking route between the De Bazel and Vijzelbank bank buildings in Vijzelstraat. Today, the tunnel is still present, but out of use and bricked up on the north side.

== Famous residents ==
- 8?: Joan van Oosterwijck, governor of the VOC, WIC and Society of Suriname
- Willem Cornelisz van Muyden lived not far from the Greenland warehouses. He attached a signboard, 'The First Whale', to his spacious home.
- 65: Pieter Corneliszoon Hooft and his wife Leonora Hellemans. After his death, his widow bought the property that the couple had lived in for years.
- 71, 73, and 127: Cornelis Trip
- 111 and 113: Hendrik Carloff and Jan Valckenburgh. They were both involved in the slave trade between the Gold Coast and South America.
- 123: Czech pedagogue John Amos Comenius, who had moved in with Louis de Geer
- 137–139: Samuel Blommaert
- 139: Hugo Metsers
- 141: Laurens Reael and Jacques Specx
- 149: Hans van Loon, governor of the VOC and Boudewijn Büch
- 198: Hendrick van Baerle. He was involved in slave transports to Suriname
- 209: Gerrit Reynst and Jan Reynst, art collectors
- 210: The doctor and mayor Nicolaes Tulp
- 217: Daniël Deutz, mayor of Amsterdam, the lawyer Jacob Walraven, Jan Heemskerk., and his son Theo Heemskerk, both home affairs minister.
- 224: David van Baerle, the merchant Jean de Neufville and Pieter van Winter, art collectors
- 285: Kiliaen van Rensselaer, his neighbor was Jacques l'Hermite
- 289: Van Hall family, possibly the birthplace of Walraven van Hall
- Johan van Scharphuizen lived next to the Theatre of Van Campen, and later also Carel Wouter Visscher
- 317: Christoffer Brands
- 319: the actor Rutger Hauer
- 385: Jacob de Wit
- 444–446: the Openbare Bibliotheek Amsterdam (Amsterdam Public Library) until 2007, Mattheus Lestevenon, the ambassador in France, and the bankers and art collectors Thomas Hope, Henry Hope and Adriaan van der Hoop
- 452: Van Loon family and Gerard Arnout Hasselaer
- At the Molenpad, Pieter and François Hemony established their bell foundry. The first Italian opera was performed on the site in 1680 by Dirck Strijcker.
- 456: the surgeon David van Gesscher
- 458: Frederick Coyett, the last governor of Dutch Formosa.
- Between the Leidsegracht and the Leidsestraat on the even side lived the poet Nicolaas Simon van Winter
- 492: Hans van Willigenburg
- 515: Actor Chris Zegers
- 518 Benno Premsela has lived for decades here, and rebuilt it in his characteristic style.
- 529: Once the home of America's second president, John Adams.
- 560: Jacob van Lennep
- 565?: Gerrit van Uylenburgh, art dealer.
- 592 and 418: wallpaper painter Egbert van Drielst
- 601: Ferdinand van Collen
- 643: Matthias Trip
- 668: Mayor Cornelis Munter
- 672: Ferdinand Bol, painter
- 686: Johannes Burman, botanist
- 755: Paulien Huizinga
- Cosimo III de' Medici stayed at an unknown number with the wool and slave trader Francesco Feroni
