= Ursul Philip Boissevain =

Dutch historian and university professor

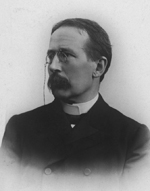
- Born: 4 November 1855; Amsterdam, Netherlands
- Died: 7 May 1930 (aged 74); Amsterdam
- Other names: Boissevain, U. Ph., Ursulus Philippus Boissevain
- Occupations: Historian and professor
- Years active: 1887–1926
- Spouse: Wilhelmina Carolina Momma

Academic background
- Education: Leiden University

Academic work
- Main interests: Ancient history
- Notable works: Cassii Dionis Cocceiani Historiarvm Romanarvm qvae svpersvnt edidit Vrsvlvs Philippvs Boissevain (1895)

Ursul Philip Boissevain (4 November 1855 – 7 May 1930) was a Dutch historian and professor.

== Biography ==
Boissevain was born in Amsterdam as the fifth and youngest son of Henri Jean Arnaud Boissevain and Petronella Drost. He was named after Ursuline Philippine Baroness of Verschuer (1794–1866), wife of theologian Hermann Friedrich Kohlbrugge. He studied in Leiden where he wrote his dissertation in 1879. He also studied in Berlin. After his studies Boissevain traveled through Europe and lived in Italy for a number of years. In 1882 he started teaching classical languages at the Erasmus Gymnasium in Rotterdam. Two years later Boissevain married Wilhelmina Carolina Momma (1859 – 1921).

In 1887 he was appointed professor in Ancient History at the University of Groningen. From 1889 onwards he also taught 'Roman Antiquities'. He has published various historical works and treatises, including a five-volume edition of the Historia Romana (Roman History) of Cassius Dio. In 1898 Boissevain became a member of the Royal Netherlands Academy of Arts and Sciences. Between 1911 – 1922 he was the vice-chairman of the academy.

In 1911, Boissevain became professor at the University of Amsterdam, followed by his retirement in 1926. He died a few years later after a short illness, and was buried at Zorgvlied cemetery in Amsterdam.
