= Joost Ritman =

Dutch businessman (1941–2026)

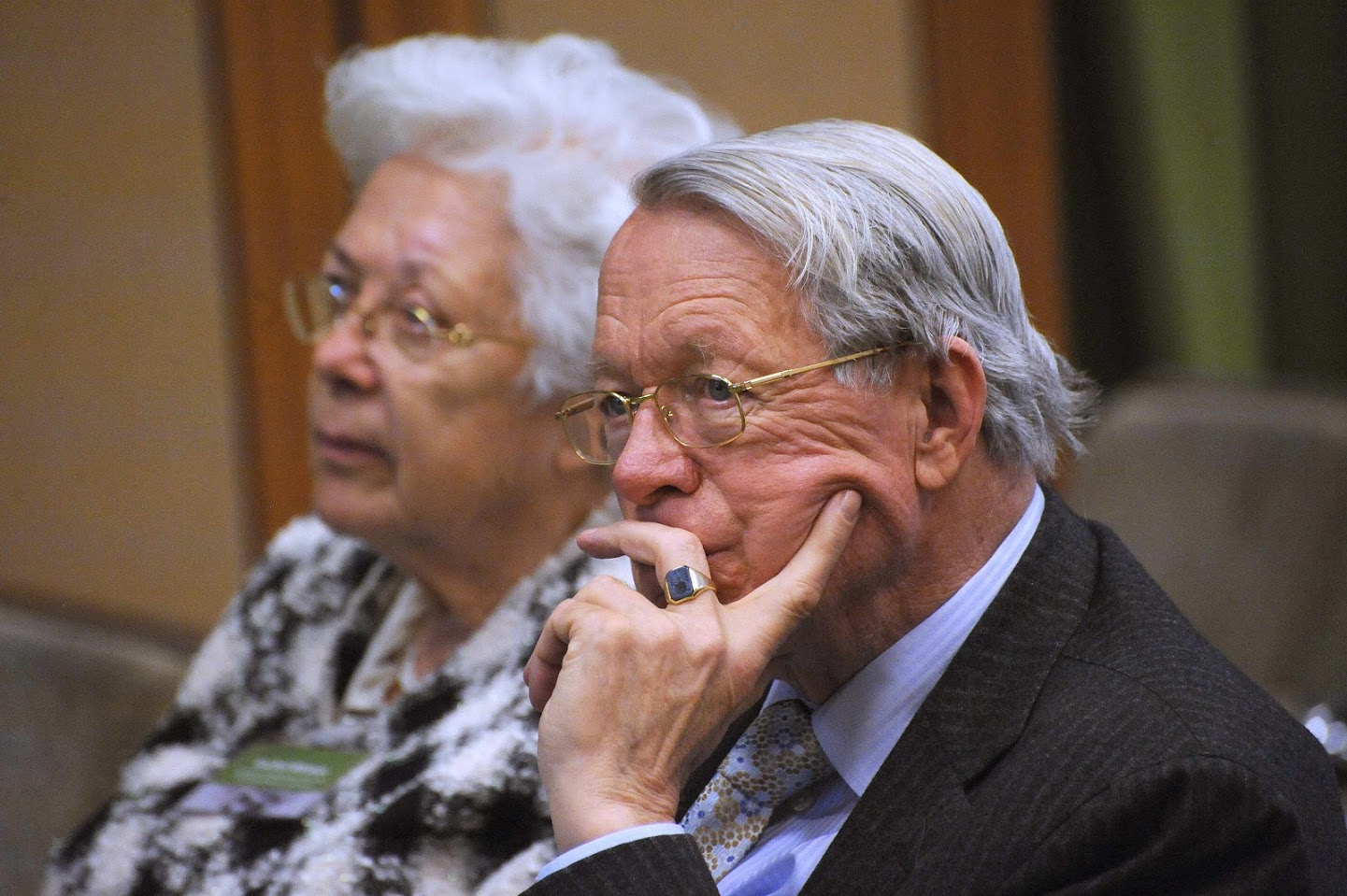
Ritman in 2017

Joost R. Ritman (10 March 1941 – 5 June 2026) was a Dutch businessman. He made his fortune with his family company De Ster, selling plastic tableware to airlines. Ritman was born in Amsterdam in 1941. He was the founder of the library Bibliotheca Philosophica Hermetica in Amsterdam. In 1995, he received the Laurens Janszoon Costerprijs. He was knighted in the Order of the Dutch Lion in 2002. Ritman died on 5 June 2026, at the age of 85.
