= Jacob van Lennepkanaal =

Canal in Amsterdam

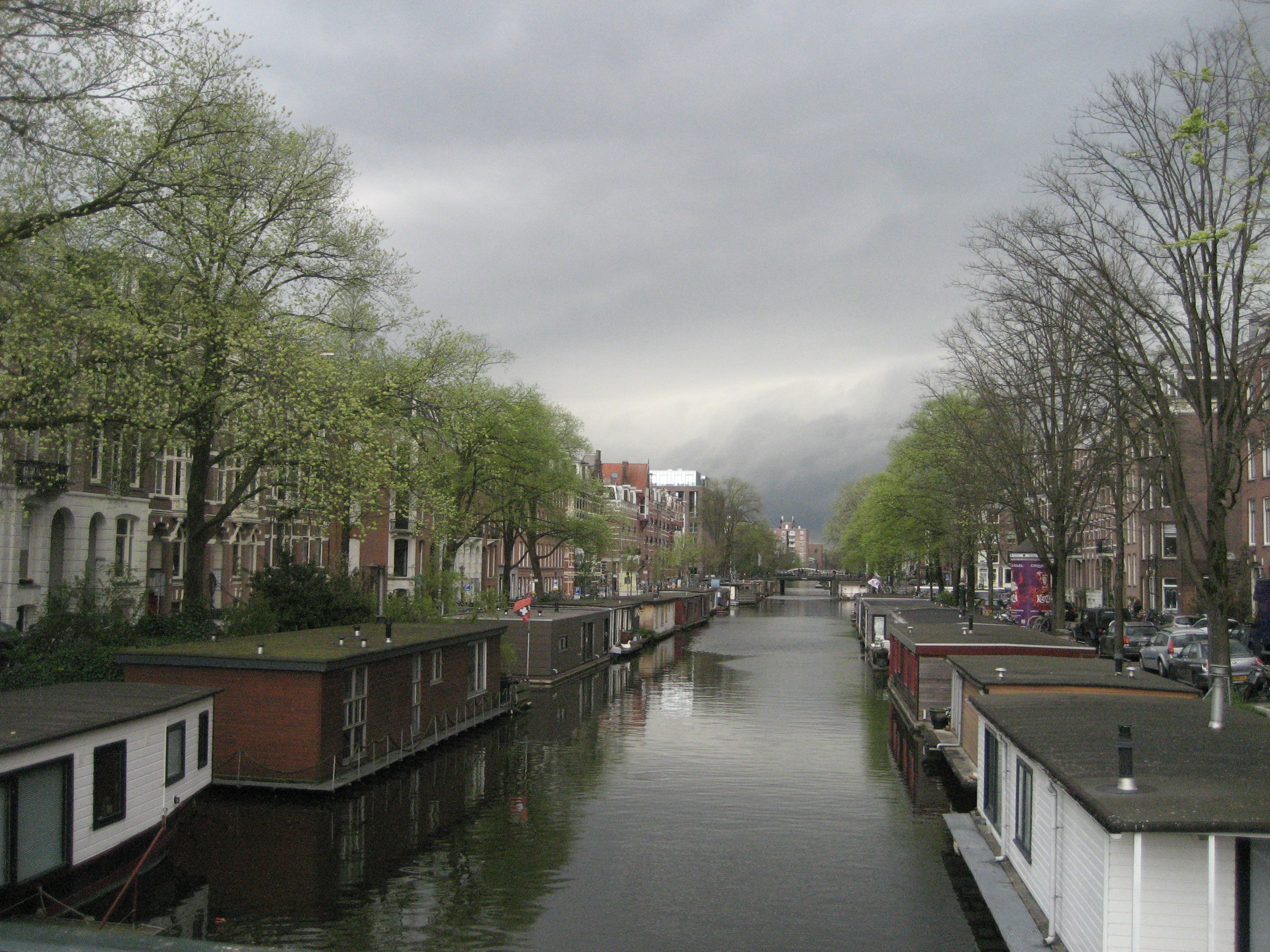
- Jacob van Lennepkanaal near Nassaukade (2014)
- Interactive map of Jacob van Lennepkanaal
- Location: Amsterdam-West, Amsterdam, Netherlands
- Coordinates: 52.3642°N 4.8685°E
- From: Singelgracht
- To: Kostverlorenvaart

The Jacob van Lennepkanaal is a canal in Amsterdam-West, named after the Dutch writer Jacob van Lennep (1802-1868).

The canal connects the Singelgracht with the Kostverlorenvaart. The Da Costagracht and the Bilderdijkgracht flow into the Jacob van Lennepkanaal on the north side.

The quays, along which houseboats are moored, are called Jacob van Lennepkade. Jacob van Lennepstraat runs parallel to the canal to the north. To the south of the canal is Kanaalstraat, named after the canal.

== Monuments ==
On the south bank of the canal are two national monuments, built at a time when the Wilhelmina Gasthuis was one of the city's most important hospitals:

- WG-plein 500, the former surgical clinic
- Arie Biemondstraat 105-111, the “old” laboratory (the “new” laboratory Jan Swammerdam Institute was demolished in 2004).

Built in 1901, The St. Vincent Church did not achieve protected monument status and was demolished in 1989.

== History ==
The canal was dug in 1886 based on a design by Nicolaas Redeker Bisdom on the site of an old ditch through the area annexed in 1896 from the municipality of Nieuwer-Amstel, replacing the Overtoomse Vaart, which was filled in during 1902 and designated as the access road for traffic to the city center.

The name Jacob van Lennepkanaal was established by council resolution of both the municipalities of Nieuwer-Amstel (1892) and Amsterdam (1896).

At the time the canal was constructed, all bridges were movable, except for the Ketel and Jan Swammerdam bridges, which were built later. Due to the increase in car traffic in the late 1930s, the bridges were replaced by fixed bridges around 1937.

In the 1968 metro plan, the (never constructed) route of the underground metro line to Osdorp was planned to run under the Jacob van Lennep Canal. This route would be an extension of the current metro line 54.

== Gallery ==
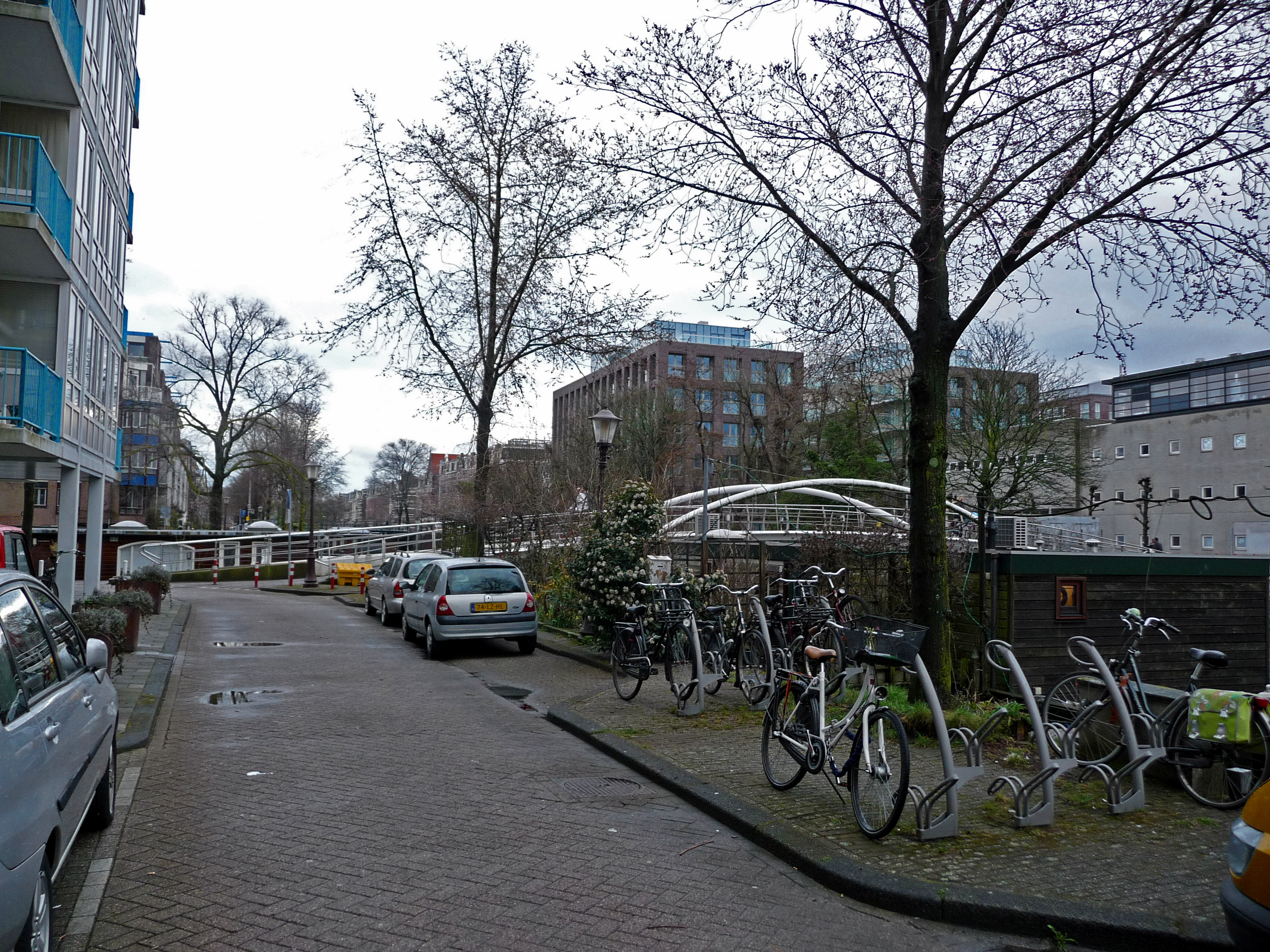
The Jacob van Lennepkade crosses the Bilderdijkgracht here (without a bridge) (2013)

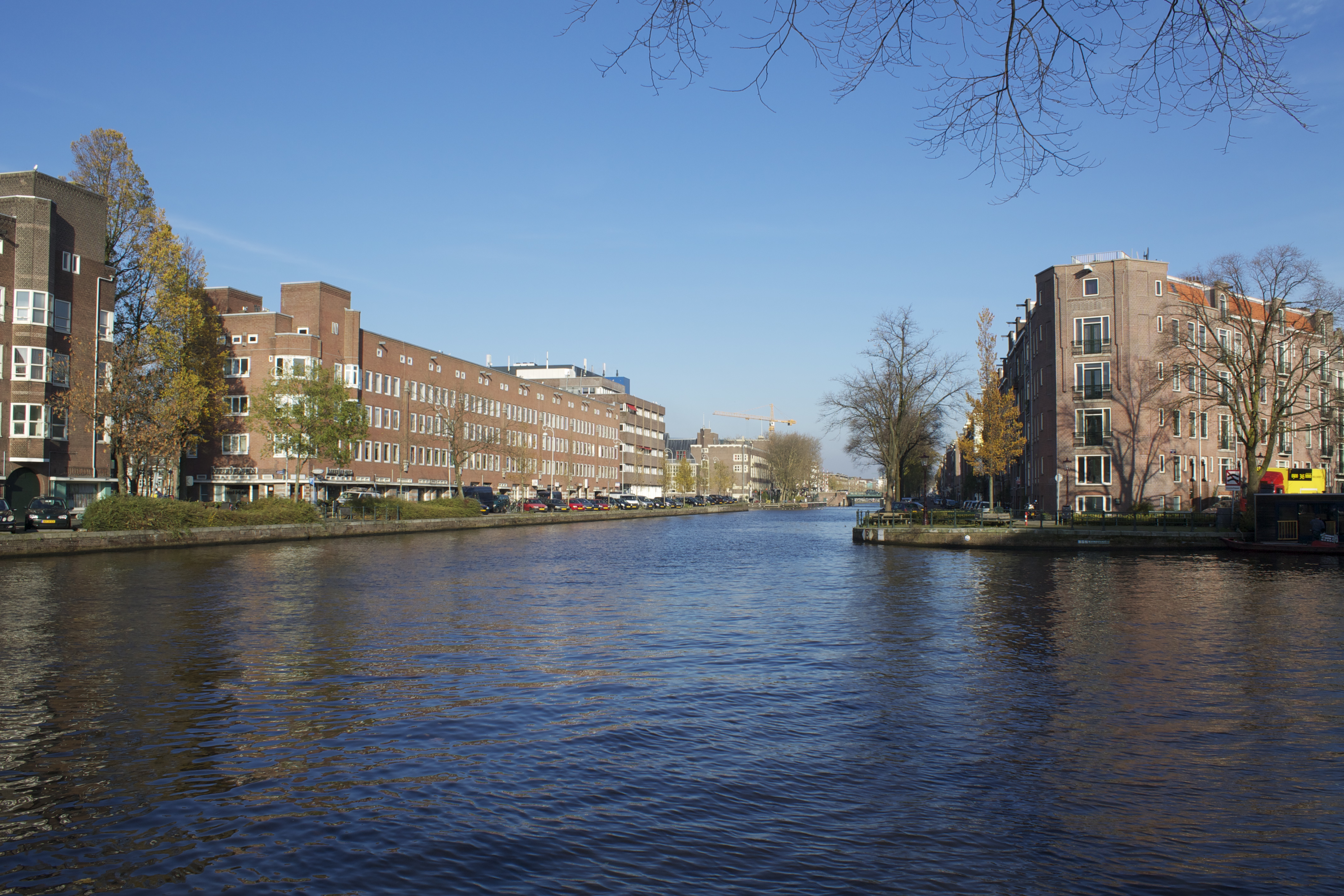
Jacob van Lennepkanaal (2013)

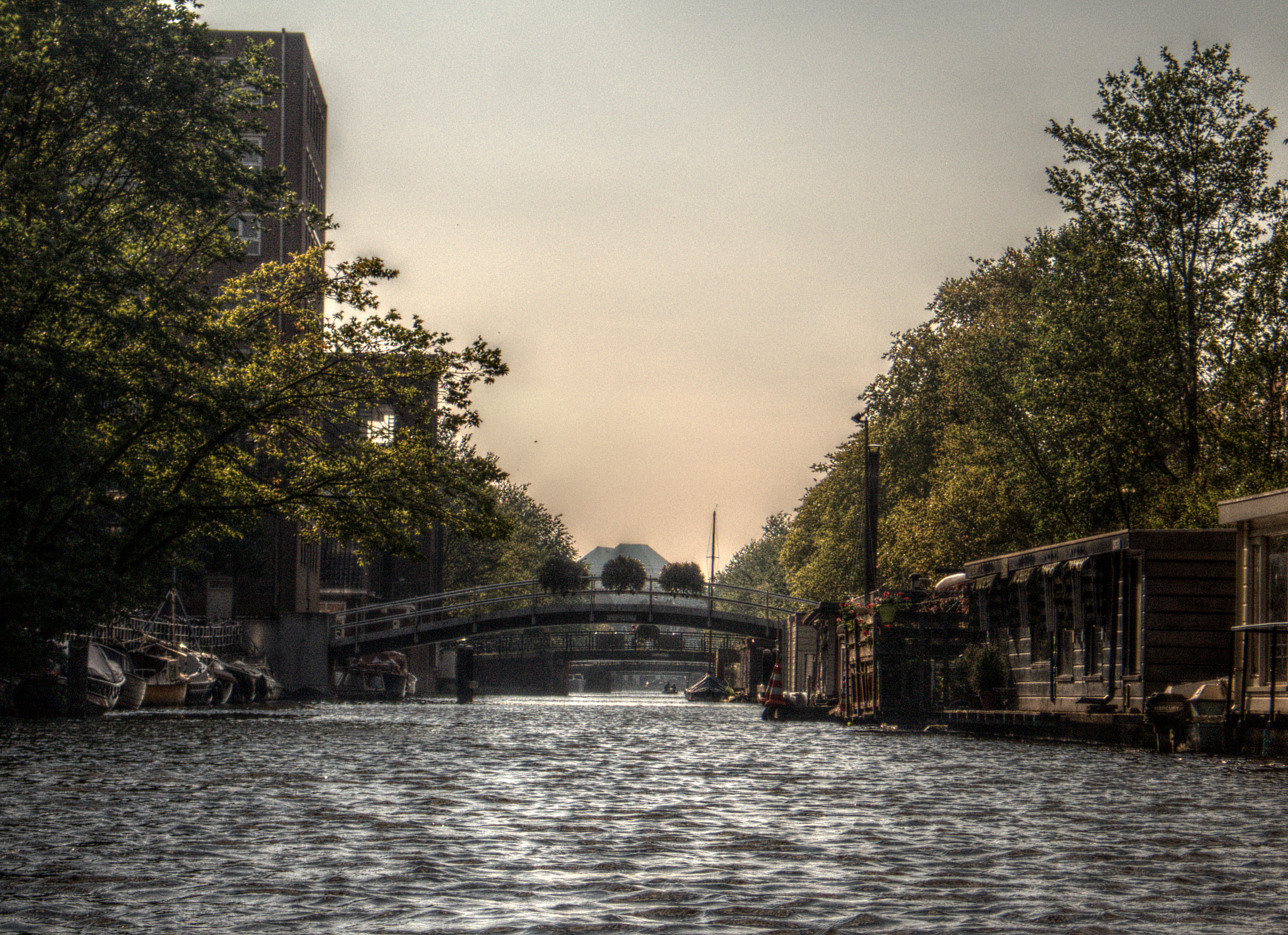
The Jacob van Lennepkanaal viewed towards the Kostverlorenvaart, with several buildings of the former Wilhelmina Gasthuis hospital on the left (2013)

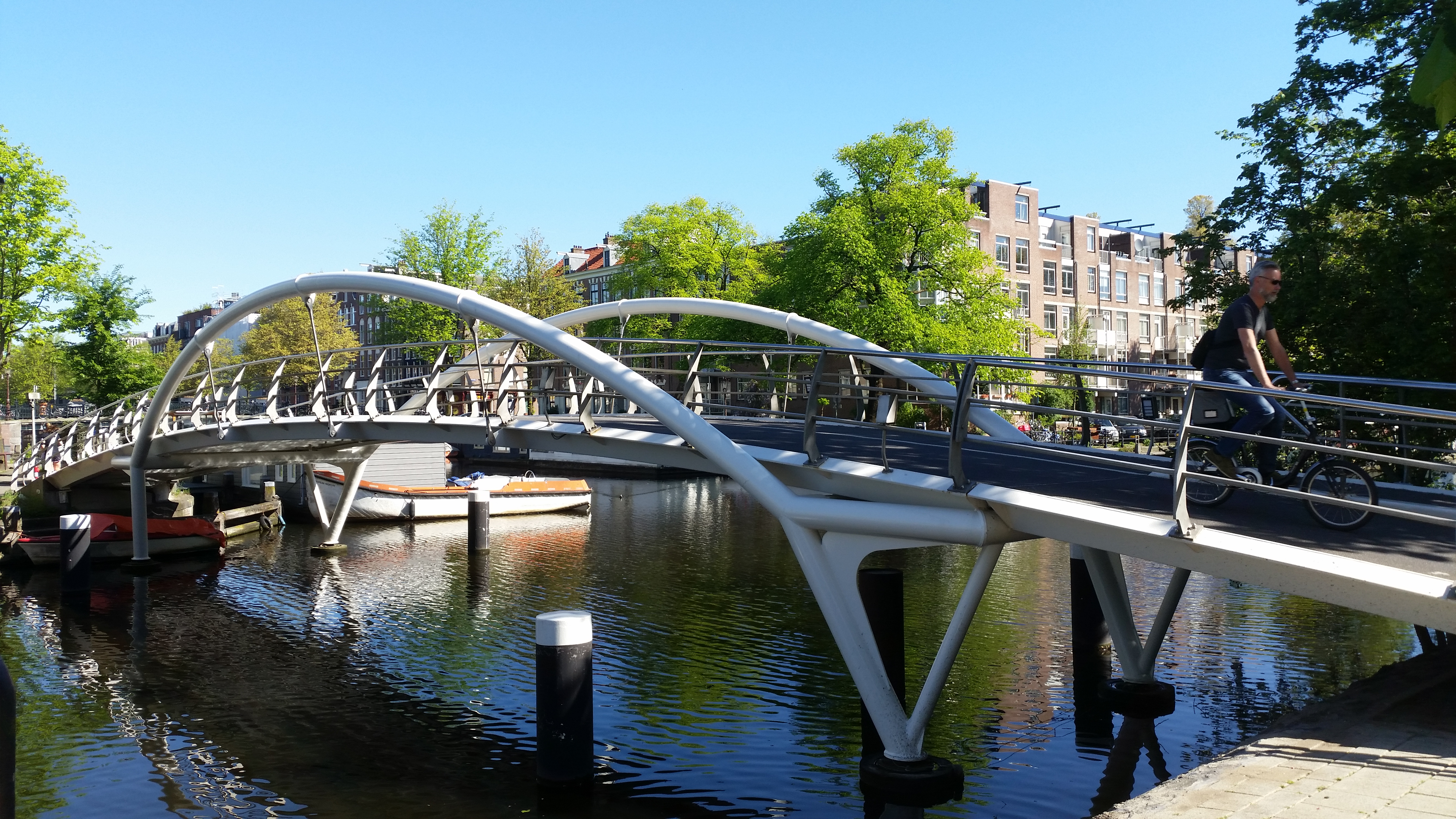
Jan Swammerdam Bridge seen from the southwest (2018)

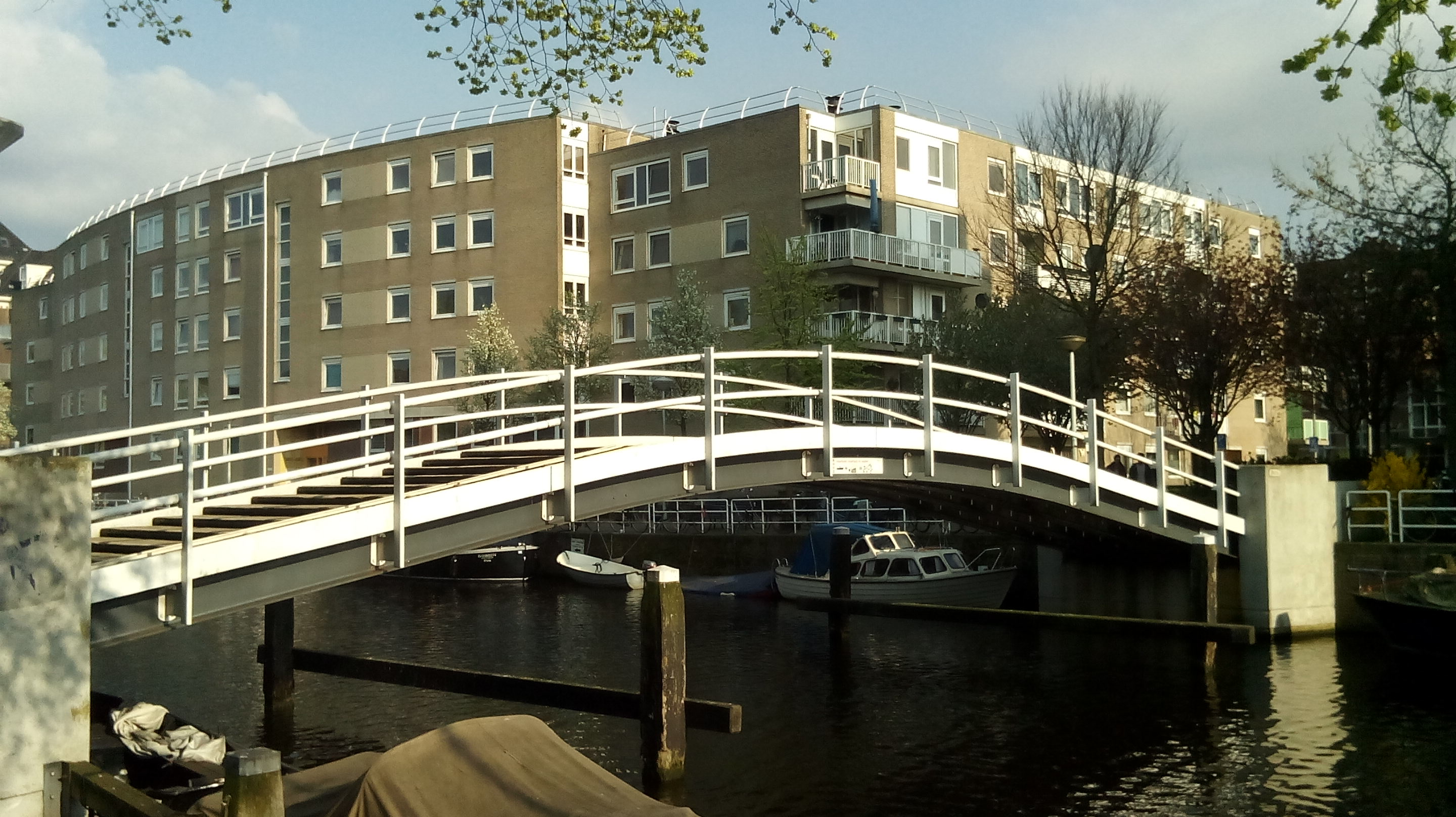
A footbridge near Ten Katestraat (2017)

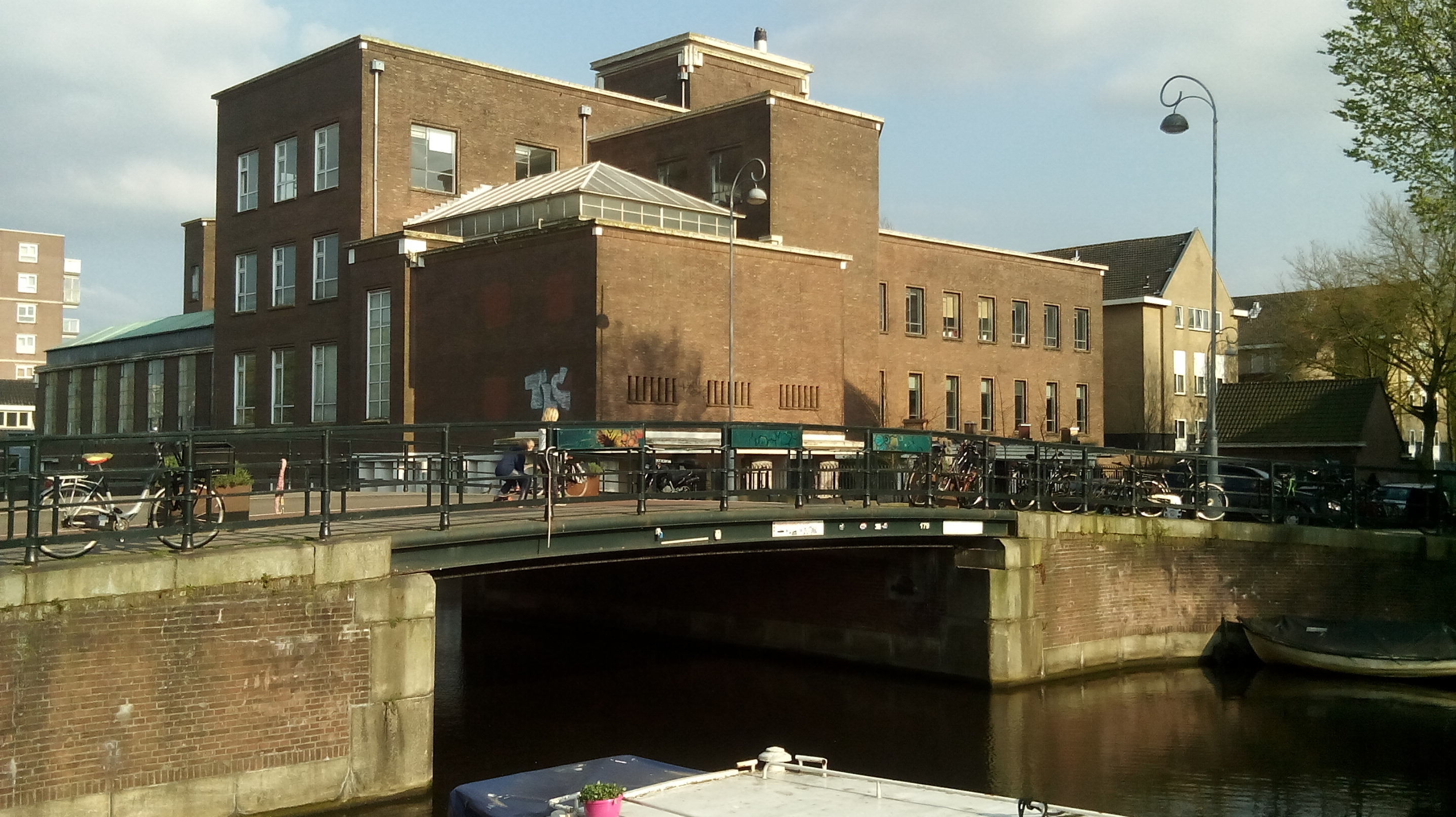
Hennetjesbrug in Nicolaas Beetsstraat, with the old laboratory (2017)
