= Canals of Amsterdam =

17th-century canals in the Netherlands; UNESCO World Heritage Site

Seventeenth-Century Canal Ring Area of Amsterdam inside the Singelgracht
UNESCO World Heritage Site
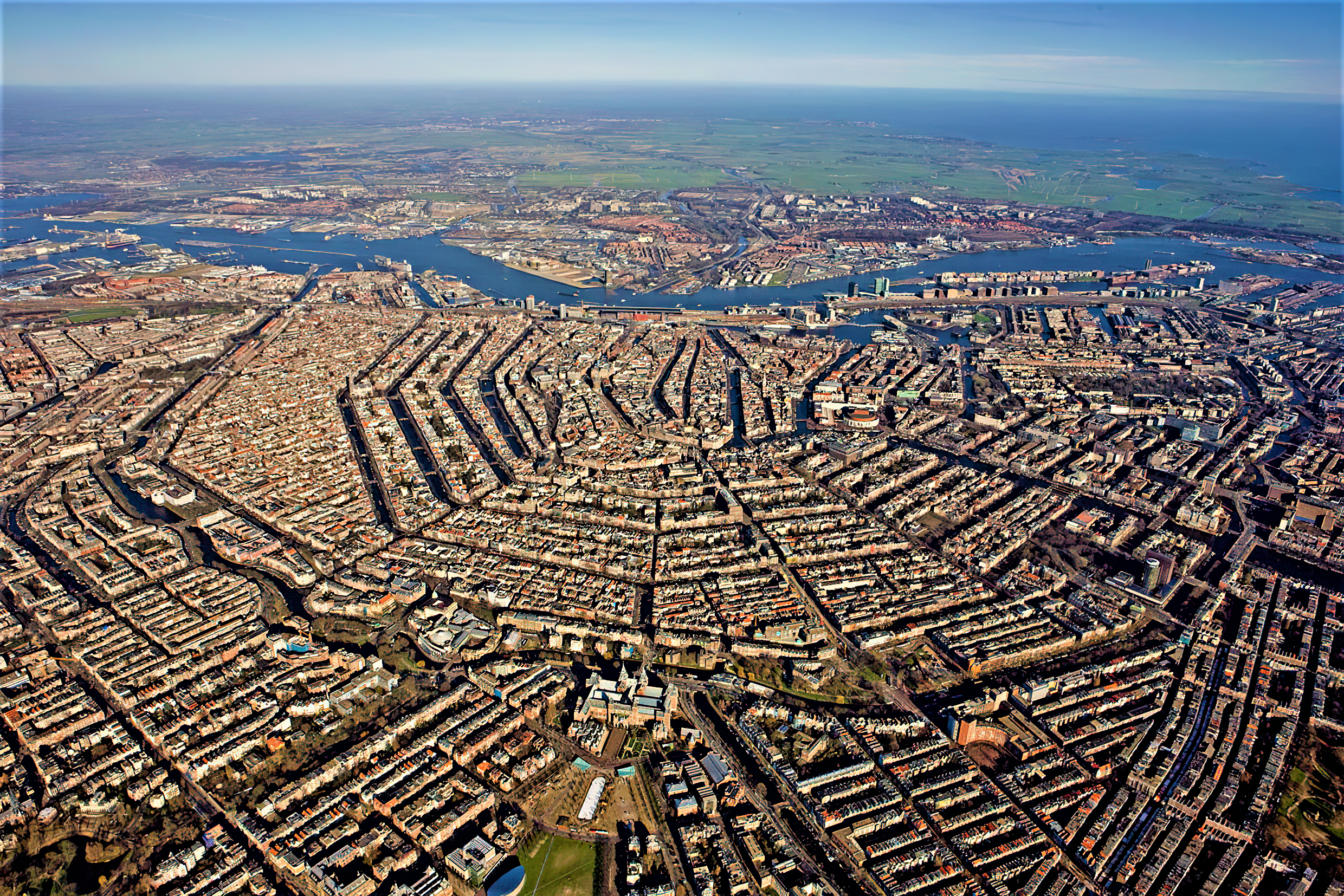
- Aerial view of the Canals of Amsterdam

- Location within North Holland Location within Netherlands
- Location: Amsterdam, North Holland, Netherlands
- Criteria: Cultural: (i)(ii)(iv)
- Reference: 1349
- Inscription: 2010 (34th Session)
- Area: 198.2 ha (490 acres)
- Buffer zone: 481.7 ha (1,190 acres)
- Coordinates: 52°21′54″N 4°53′16″E

Amsterdam, capital of the Netherlands, has more than 100 kilometers (62 mi) of grachten (canals), about 90 islands and 1,500 bridges. The three main canals (Herengracht, Prinsengracht and Keizersgracht), dug in the 17th century during the Dutch Golden Age, form concentric belts around the city, known as the Grachtengordel. Alongside the main canals are 1,550 monumental buildings. The 17th-century canal ring area, including the Prinsengracht, Keizersgracht, Herengracht and Jordaan, were listed as UNESCO World Heritage Site in 2010, contributing to Amsterdam's fame as the "Venice of the North". However, Amsterdam has the highest number of individual canals in Europe, and has many more bridges than Venice even in the old center alone.

== History ==
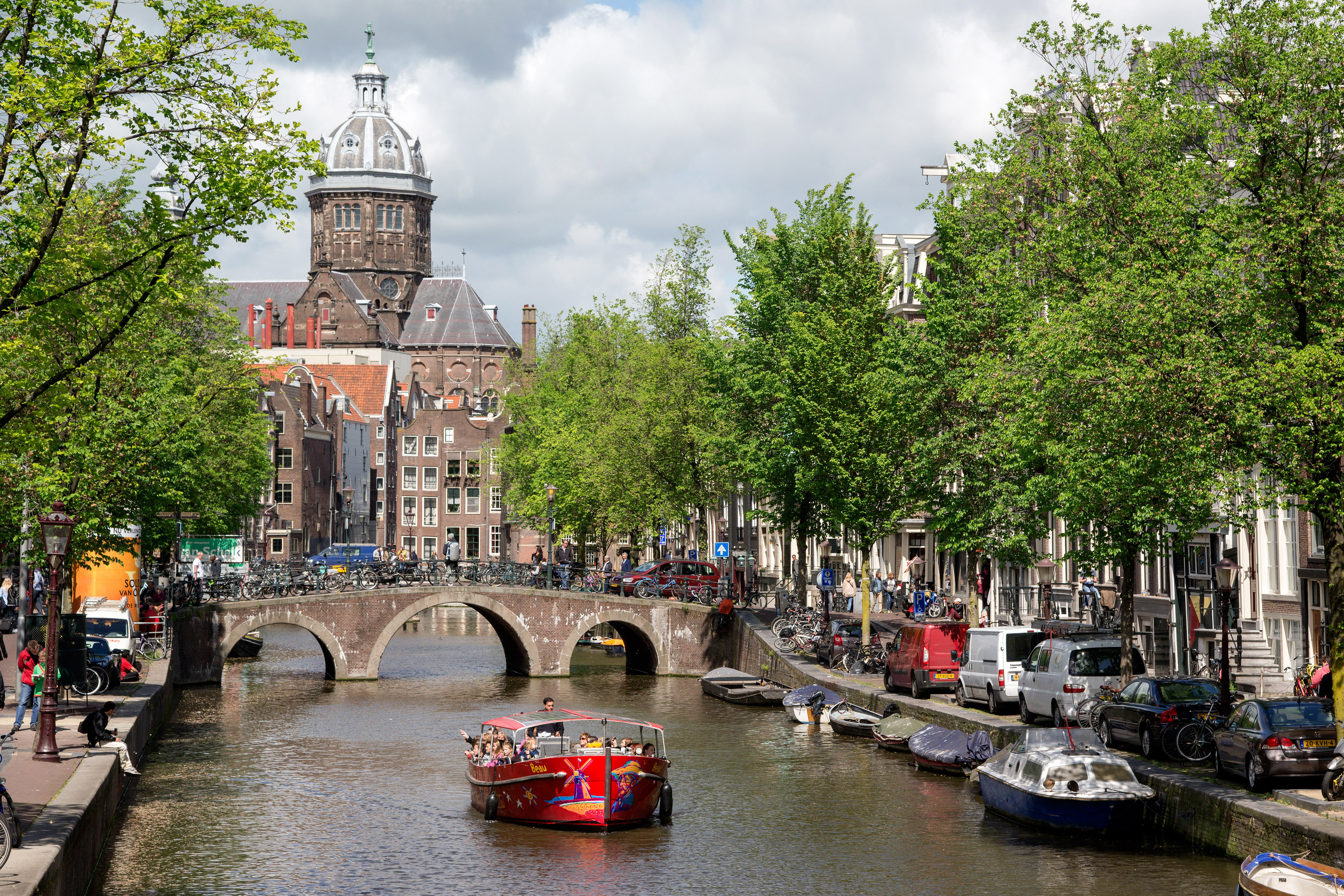
Numerous tourists view Amsterdam from canal boat tours (2015)

Much of the Amsterdam canal system is the successful outcome of city planning. In the early part of the 17th century, with immigration rising, a comprehensive plan was put together, calling for four main, concentric half-circles of canals with their ends resting on the IJ Bay. Known as the "grachtengordel", three of the canals are mostly for residential development (Herengracht or "Patricians' Canal"; Keizersgracht or "Emperor's Canal"; and Prinsengracht or "Prince's Canal"), and a fourth, outer canal, the Singelgracht, for purposes of defense and water management. The plan also envisaged interconnecting canals along radii; a set of parallel canals in the Jordaan quarter (primarily for the transportation of goods, for example, beer); the conversion of an existing, inner perimeter canal (Singel) from a defensive purpose to residential and commercial development; and more than one hundred bridges. The defensive purpose of the Nassau/Stadhouderskade was served by moat and earthen dikes, with gates at transit points but otherwise no masonry superstructures.

Construction proceeded from west to east, across the breadth of the layout, like a gigantic windshield wiper as the historian Geert Mak calls it – not from the center outwards as a popular myth has it. Construction of the north-western sector was started in 1613 and was finished around 1625. After 1664, building in the southern sector was started, although slowly because of an economic depression. The eastern part of the concentric canal plan, covering the area between the Amstel river and the IJ Bay, was not implemented for a long time. In the following centuries, the land went mostly for park, the Botanical garden, old age homes, theaters and other public facilities – and for waterways without much plan.

Several parts of the city and of the urban area are polders, recognizable by their postfix -meer meaning 'lake', such as Aalsmeer, Bijlmermeer, Haarlemmermeer, and Watergraafsmeer. The canals in Amsterdam are now used for tourism, recreation, houseboats, and a relatively small amount of private transport compared to the main modes of walking, light rail, subway, and bicycle. Most of the canals are paralleled by vehicular roads on both sides.

Map of the Amsterdam city centre with its canals.

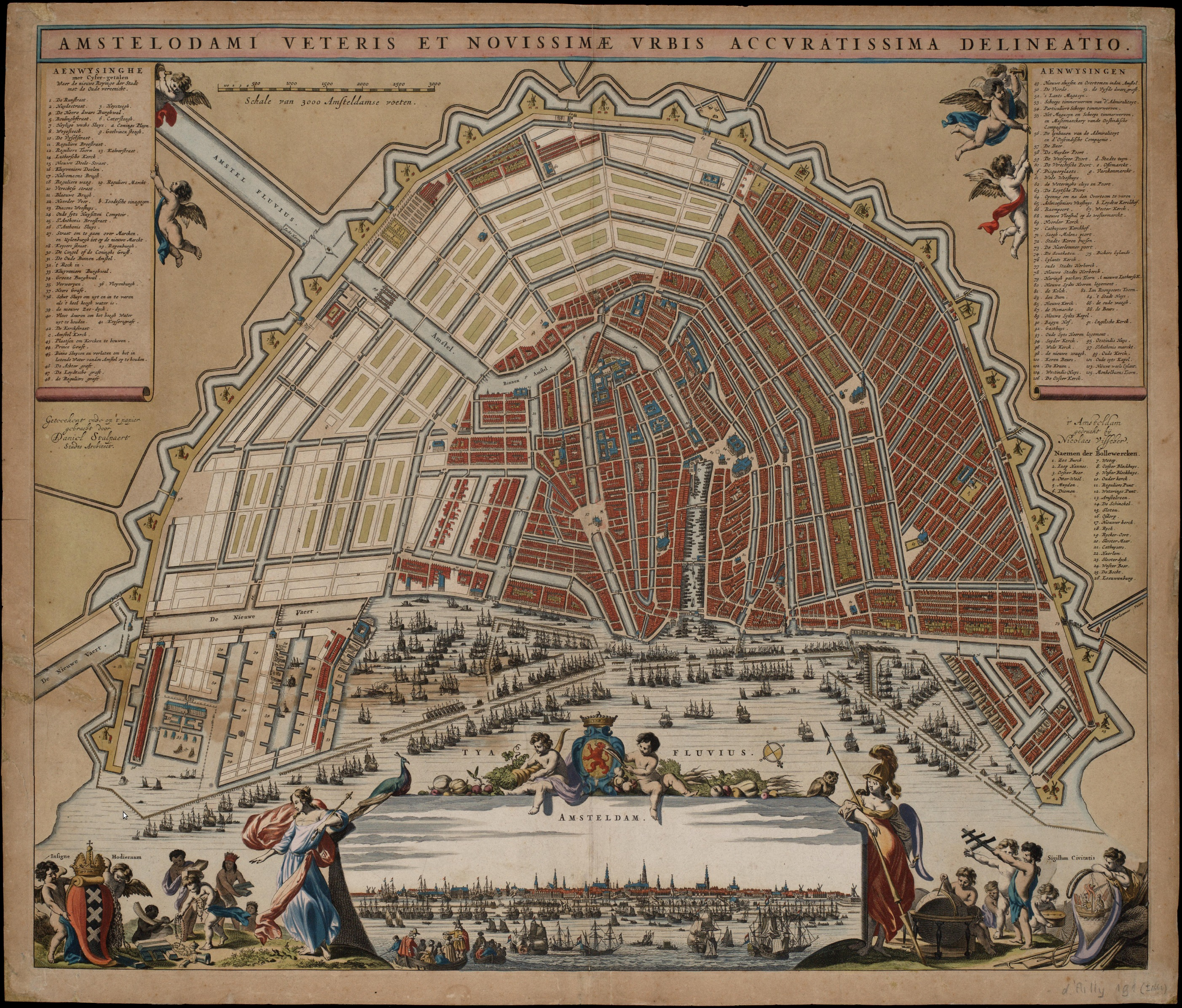
A map showing Amsterdam with its canals from 1662 CE.

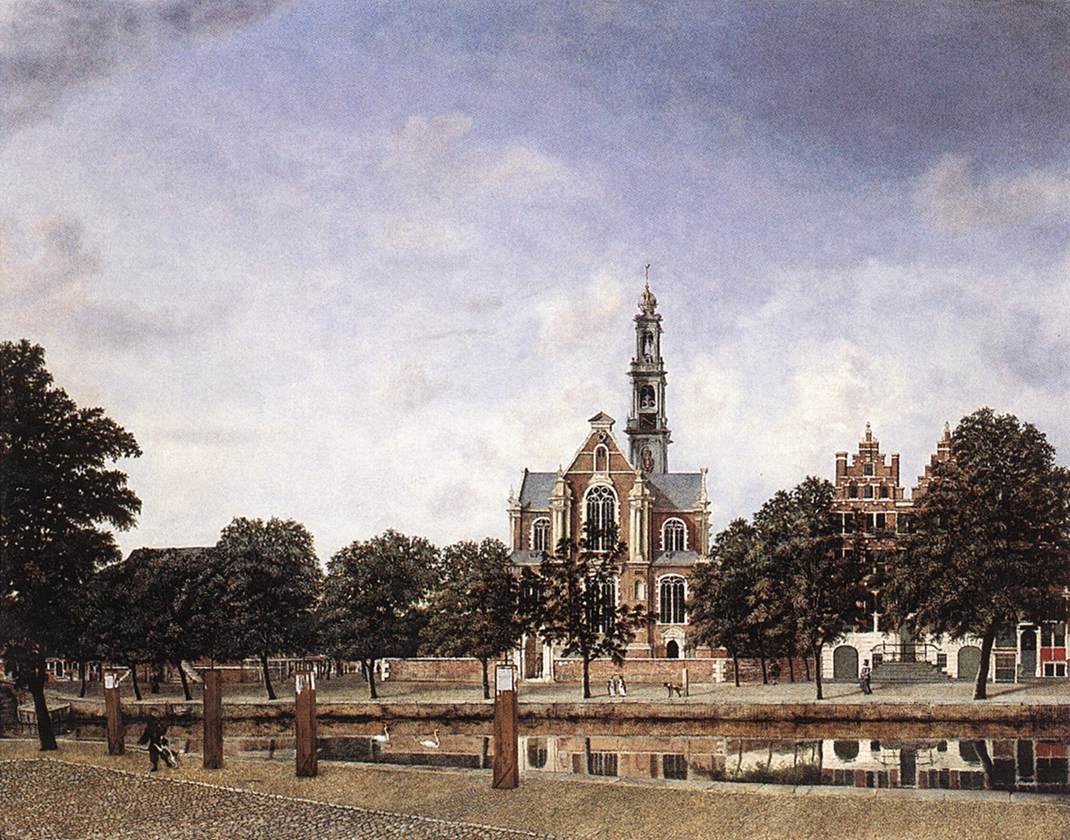
View of the Westerkerk, c. 1660 CE.

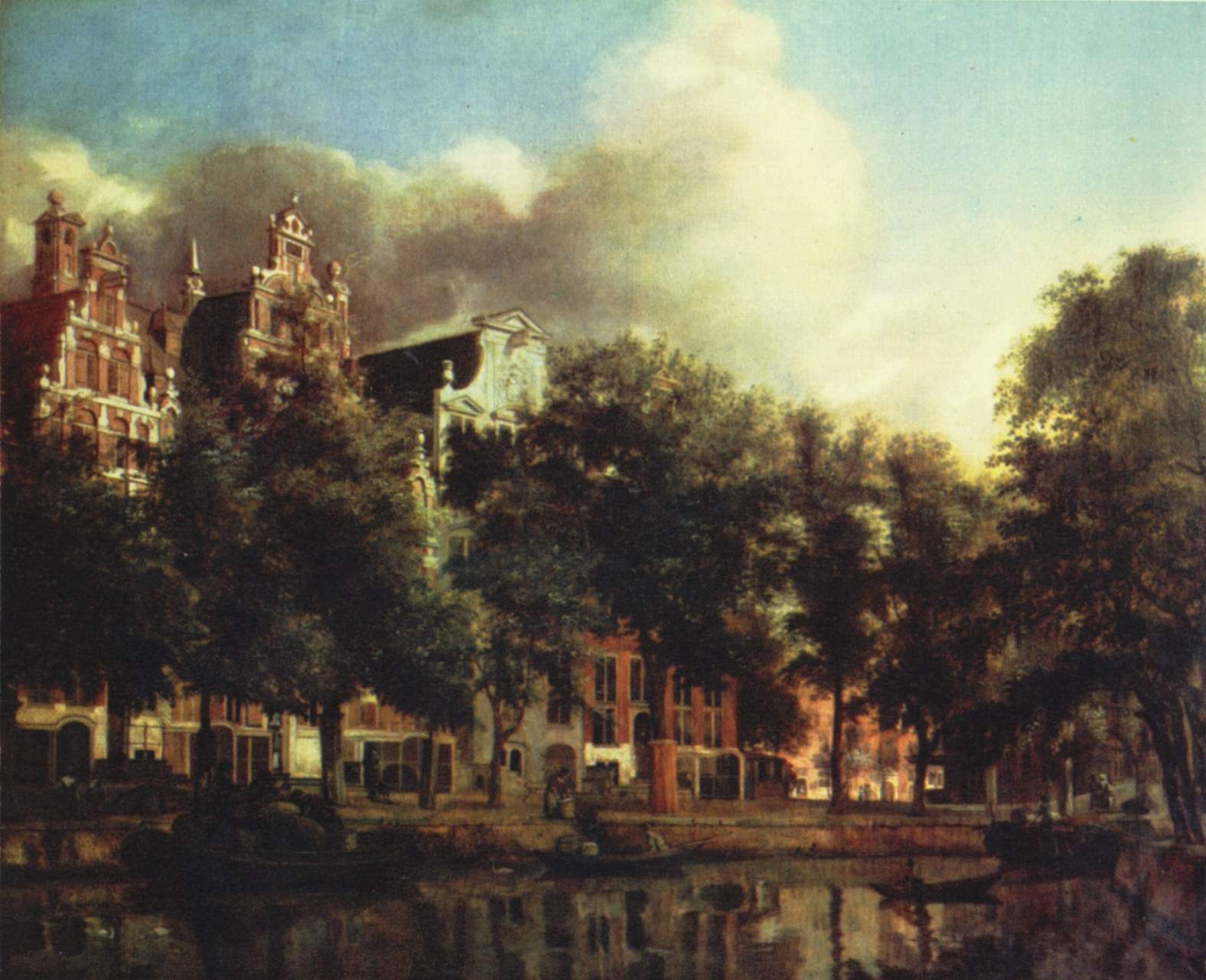
Amsterdam's canal, second half of 17th century.

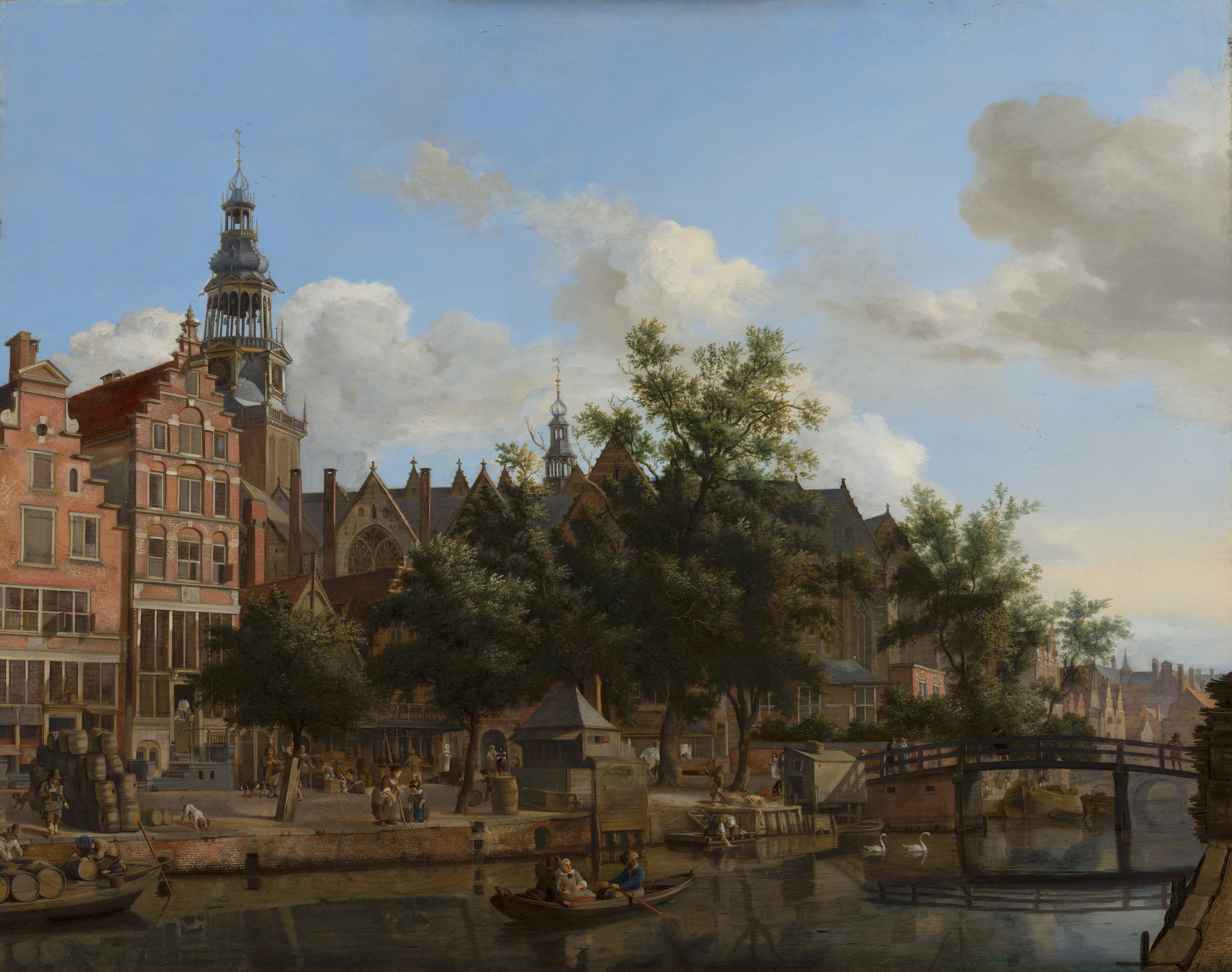
View of Oudezijds Voorburgwal, c. 1670 CE.

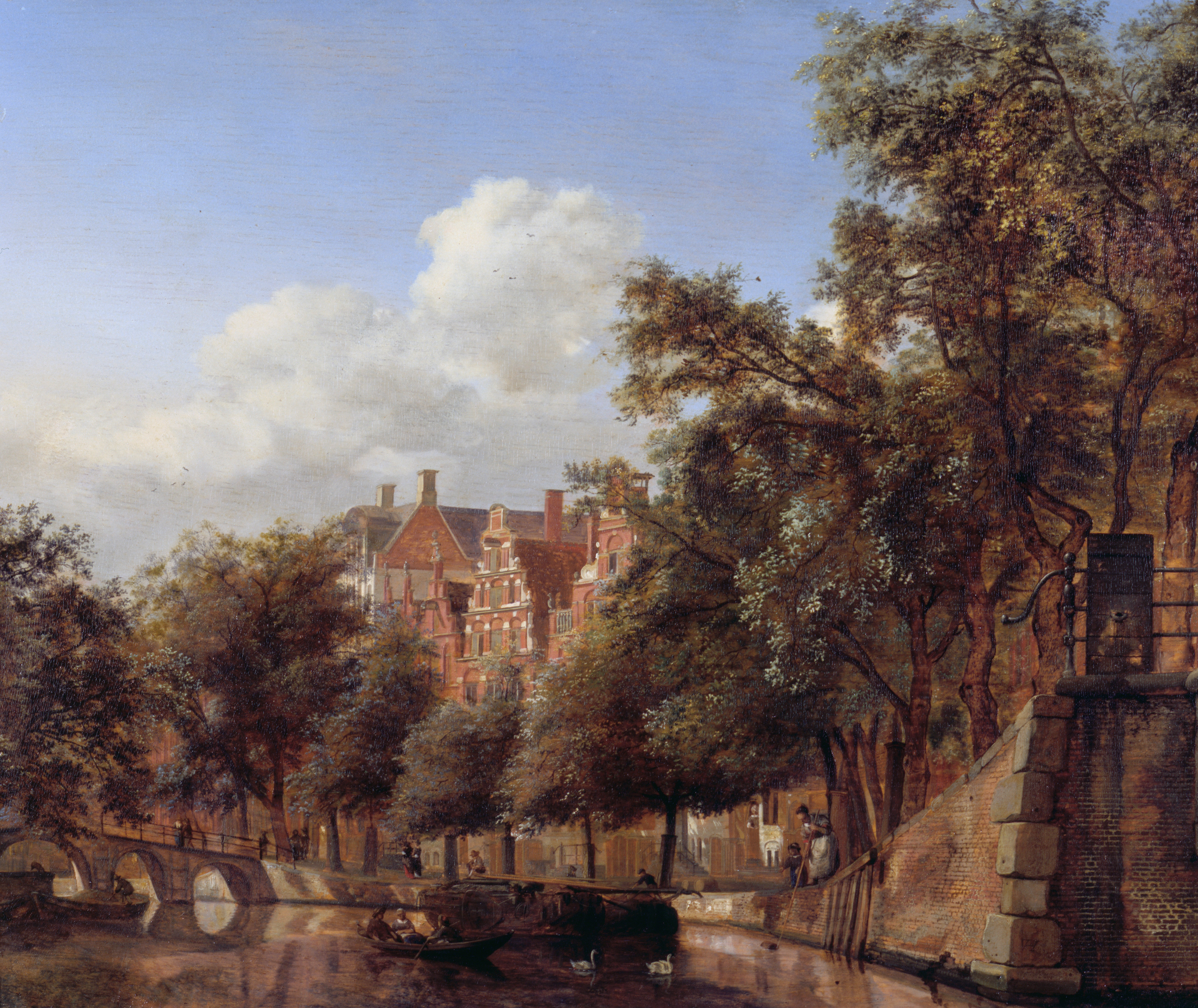
View of the Herengracht, c. 1670 CE.

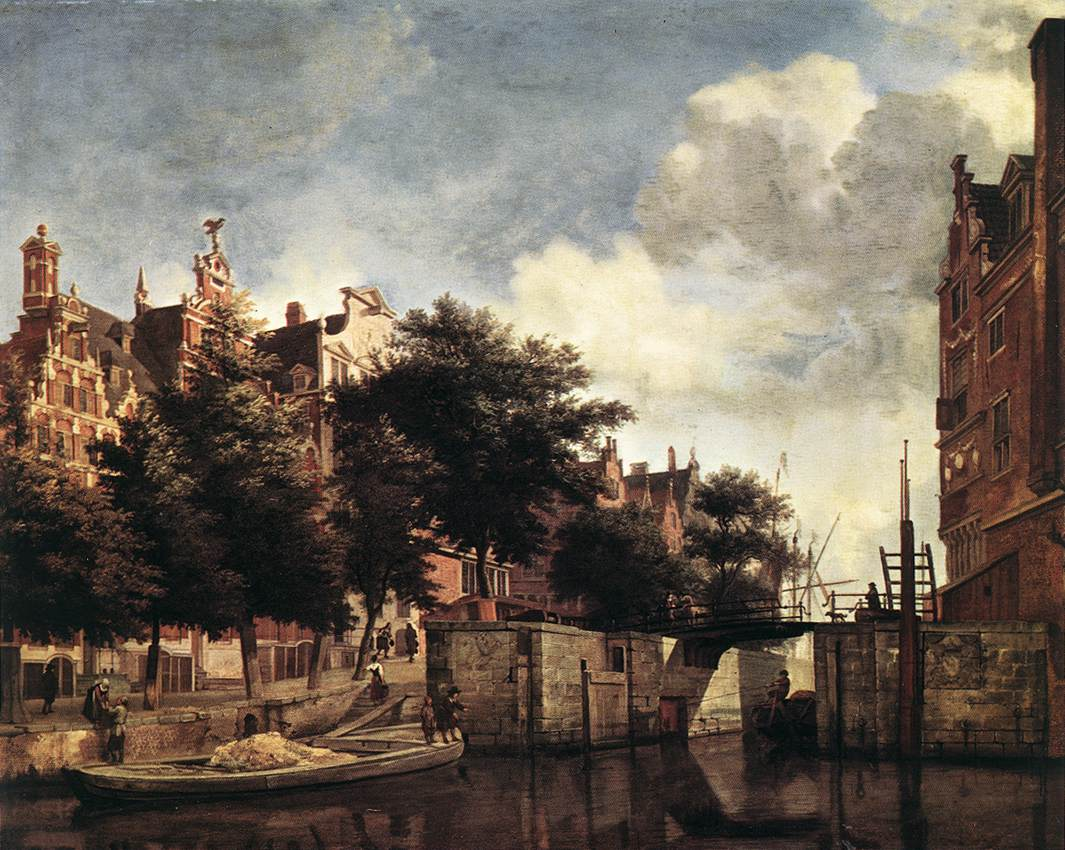
The Martelaarsgracht, c. 1670 CE.

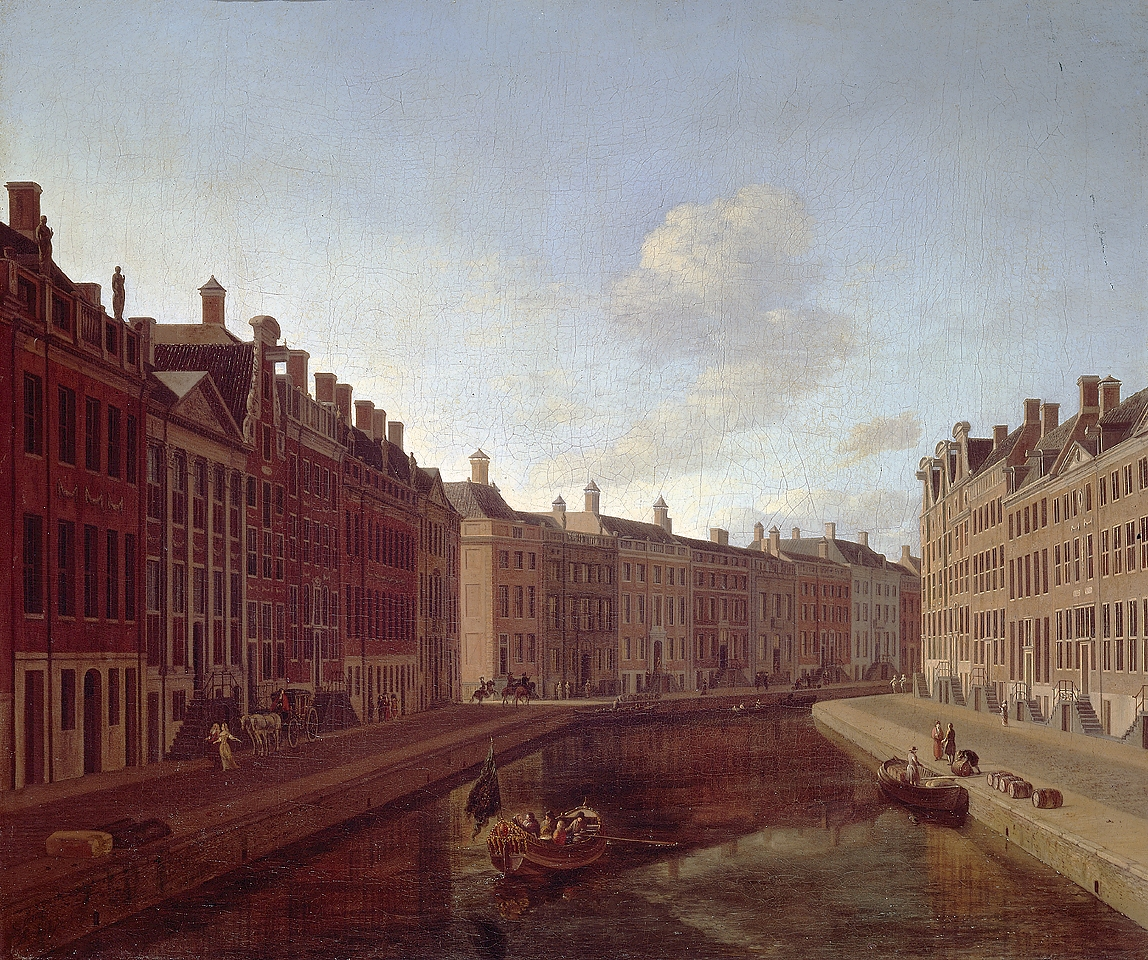
The Golden Bend, 1685 CE.

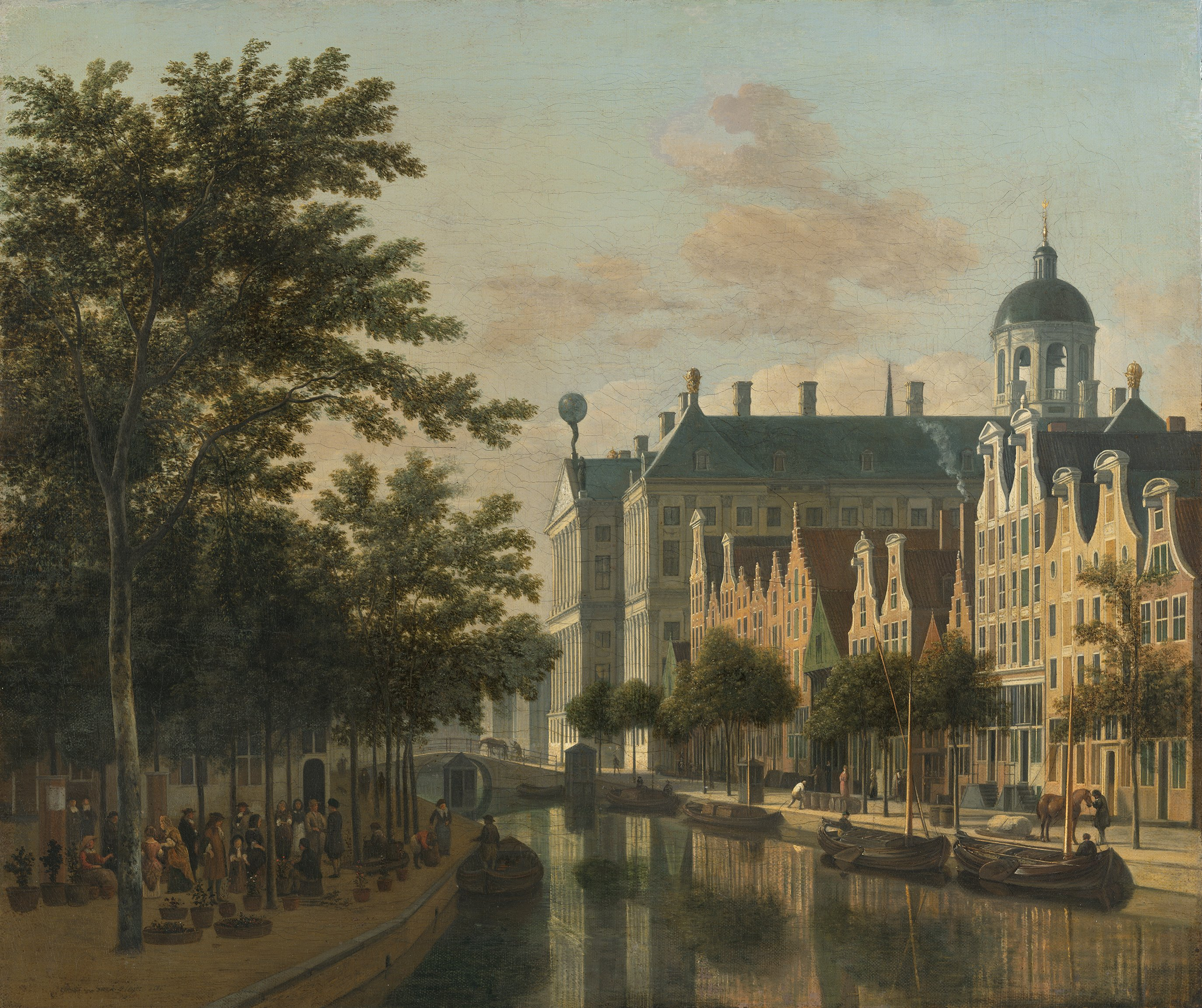
Nieuwezijds Voorburgwal, c. 1686 CE.

== Water quality ==
Through the mid-19th century, the water in the canals was stagnant and unsanitary, full of refuse, dead fish and feces. To remedy this, in 1879 the steam-powered pump station Gemaal Zeeburg was built to flush the canals out using water from Zuiderzee. Conditions were further improved in 1935 when the inner city was first connected to the sewer system, though the Grachtengordel was not fully connected until 1987. Up until this point, houses released wastewater into the canal. Further attempts to improve the water quality in recent years have included legislation prohibiting houseboats from releasing waste water into the canals. As of 2018, all houseboats are required to be connected to the sewage system, though this is not expected to be achieved until 2021. As of August 2018, more than 50 house boats were still releasing their sewage into the canals.

Another source of water pollution, particular to Dutch transport patterns, is the bicycle. Each year, between 12,000 and 15,000 bicycles are pulled out of the canals in what is colloquially referred to as 'bike fishing' (fietsen vissen).

While swimming in the canals is not officially encouraged, locals now swim each year in a number of locations around the city. Furthermore, since 2012, the Amsterdam City Swim has been held yearly to raise money for ALS research. In it, volunteers swim from Nieuwe Herengracht to Keizersgracht. However, the swimming part of the event was canceled in 2018 due to high levels of E. coli found in the water due to heavy rains the preceding weeks which overloaded the sewer system.

== Notable canals in the Canal Belt ==
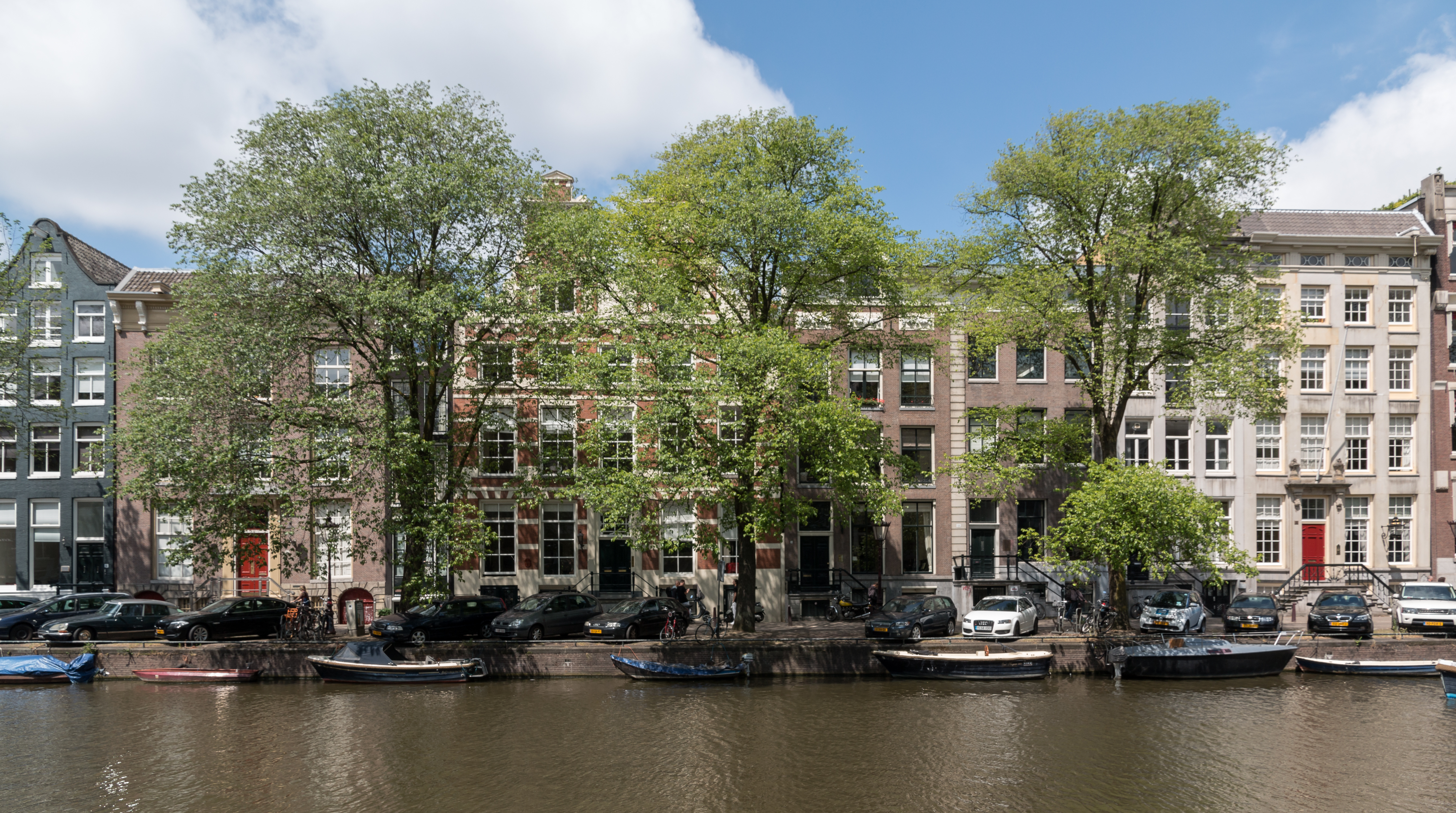
Singel

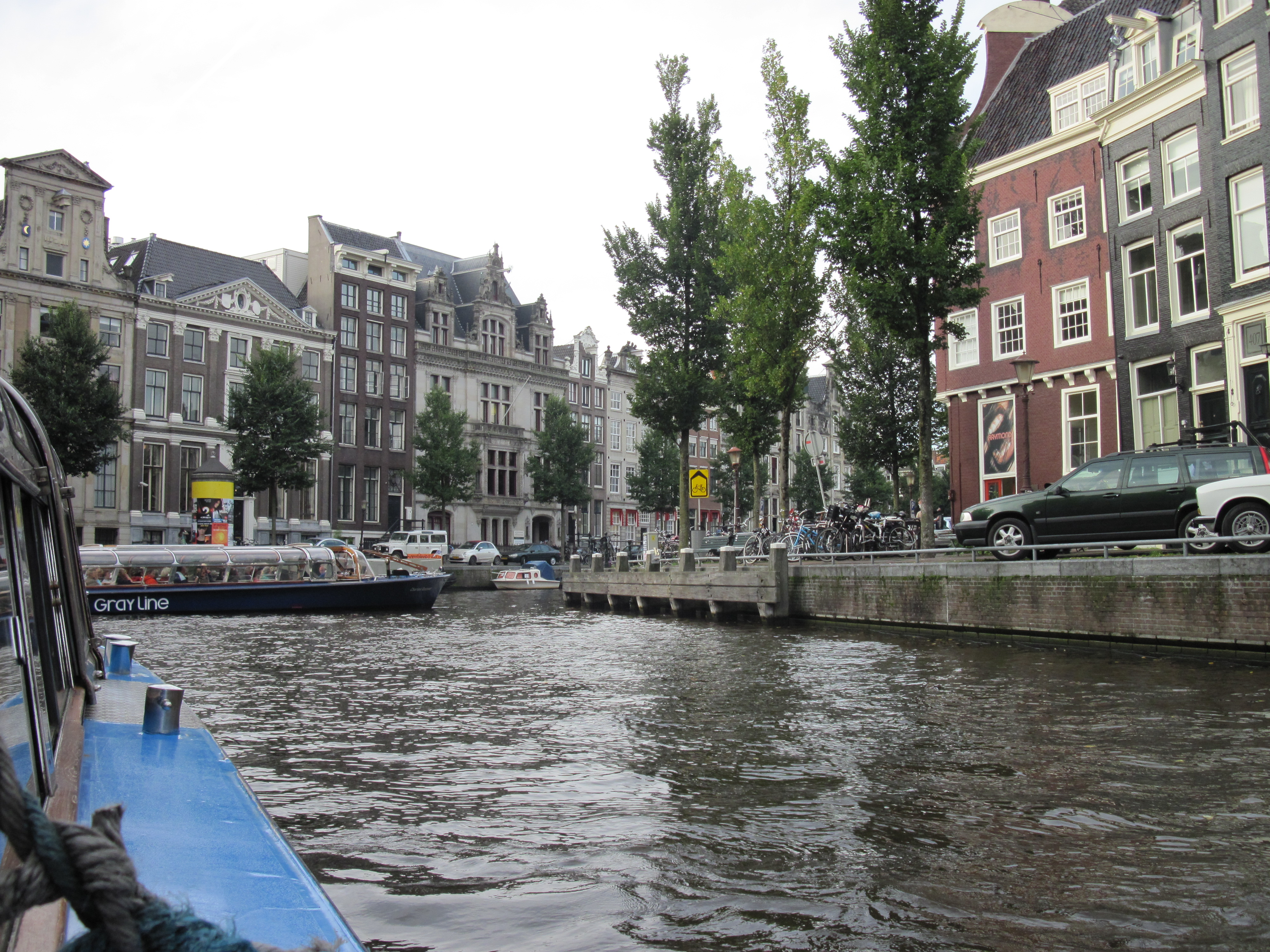
Herengracht

Inward to outward, the canals are as follows:

=== Singel ===
Singel encircled the medieval city of Amsterdam. It served as a moat around the city from 1480 until 1585, when Amsterdam expanded beyond Singel. The canal runs from the IJ Bay, near Central Station, to the Muntplein square, where it meets the Amstel river. It is now the inner-most canal in Amsterdam's semicircular ring of canals. The canal should not be confused with Singelgracht canal, which became the outer limit of the city during the Dutch Golden Age in the 17th century.

=== Herengracht ===
Herengracht (Patricians' Canal or Lords' Canal) is the first of the three major canals in the city centre of Amsterdam. The canal is named after the heren regeerders who governed the city in the 16th and 17th centuries. The most fashionable part is called the Golden Bend, with many double wide mansions, inner gardens and coach houses on Keizersgracht. Samuel Sarphati (1813–1868) lived at the house at number 598 and Peter the Great stayed at the house at number 527 during his second visit to Amsterdam.

=== Keizersgracht ===
Keizersgracht (literal English translation: Emperor's Canal) is the second and widest of the three major canals in the city centre of Amsterdam, in between Herengracht and Prinsengracht. It is named after Maximilian I, Holy Roman Emperor. John Adams stayed at the house at number 529, Heinrich Schliemann worked for almost three years at number 71, Daniel Fahrenheit at 463–465, and during his first visit to Amsterdam (1693), Peter the Great stayed at the house at number 317.

The Homomonument (Gay Monument) faces the Keizersgracht. Huis Marseille, the oldest photography museum in the Netherlands, is located at number 401, and features one of the best-preserved period rooms along the city's canals.

=== Prinsengracht ===
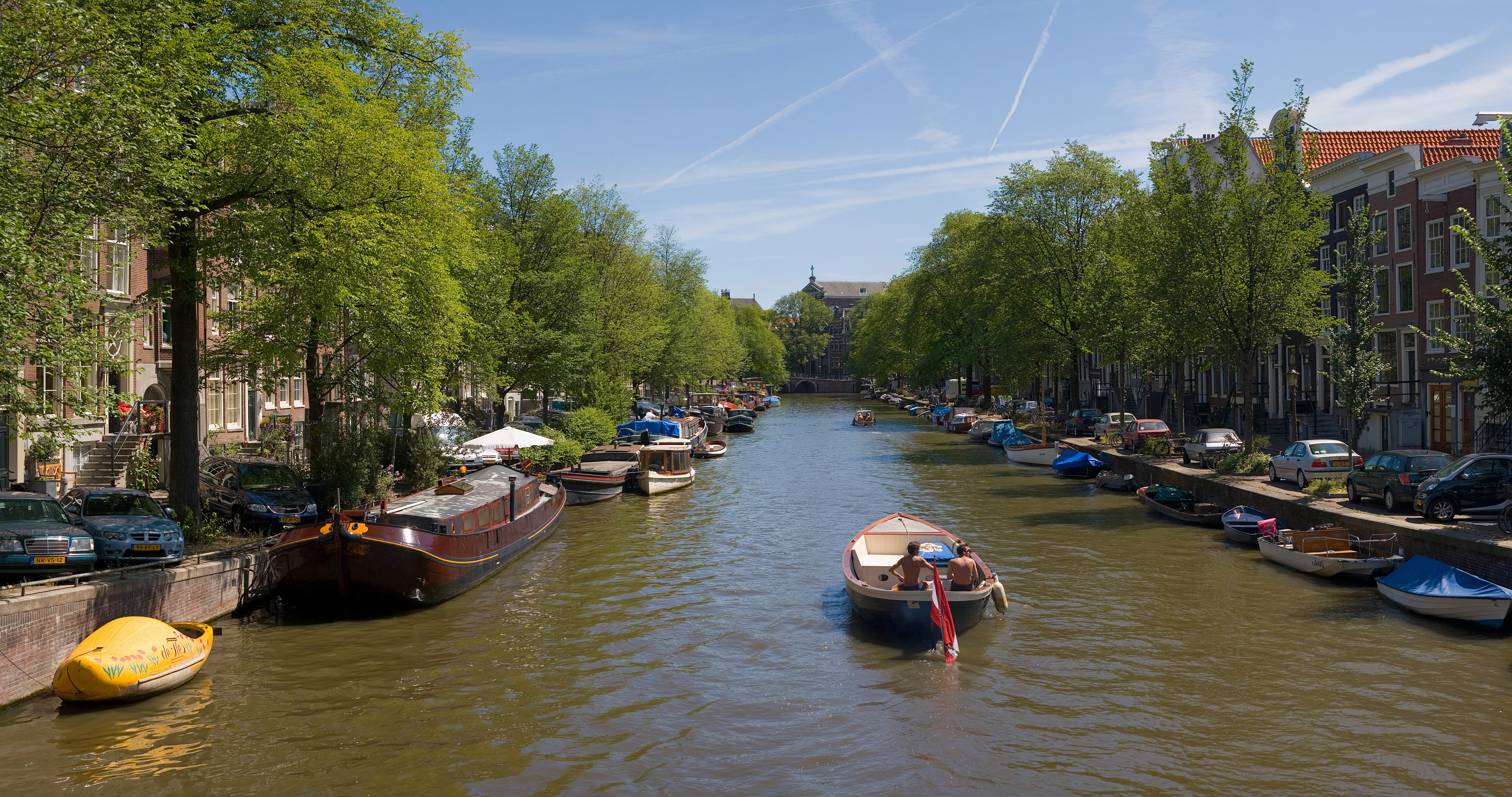
Prinsengracht

Prinsengracht (Prince's Canal) is the fourth and the longest of the main canals in Amsterdam. It is named after the Prince of Orange. Most of the canal houses along it were built during the Dutch Golden Age of the United Provinces. The bridges over the Prinsengracht canal connect with the streets in the Jordaan in the West and the Weteringbuurt on the East side.

Notable buildings along Prinsengracht include the Noorderkerk (Northern Church), the Noordermarkt (Northern Market), Anne Frank House, and the Westerkerk (Western Church, Amsterdam's tallest church).

Annually, the Prinsengrachtconcert is held on a pontoon in the canal in front of Hotel Pulitzer.

== Other notable canals ==
=== Zwanenburgwal ===
Zwanenburgwal is a canal and street in the center of Amsterdam. The painter Rembrandt and philosopher Spinoza lived here. In 2006 it was voted one of the most beautiful streets in Amsterdam by readers of Het Parool, a local daily newspaper.

Zwanenburgwal flows from Sint Antoniessluis sluice gate (between the streets Sint Antoniesbreestraat and Jodenbreestraat) to the Amstel river. The canal was originally named Verversgracht ("dyers' canal"), after the textile industry that once dominated this part of town. Dyed textiles were hung to dry along the canal.

=== Brouwersgracht ===
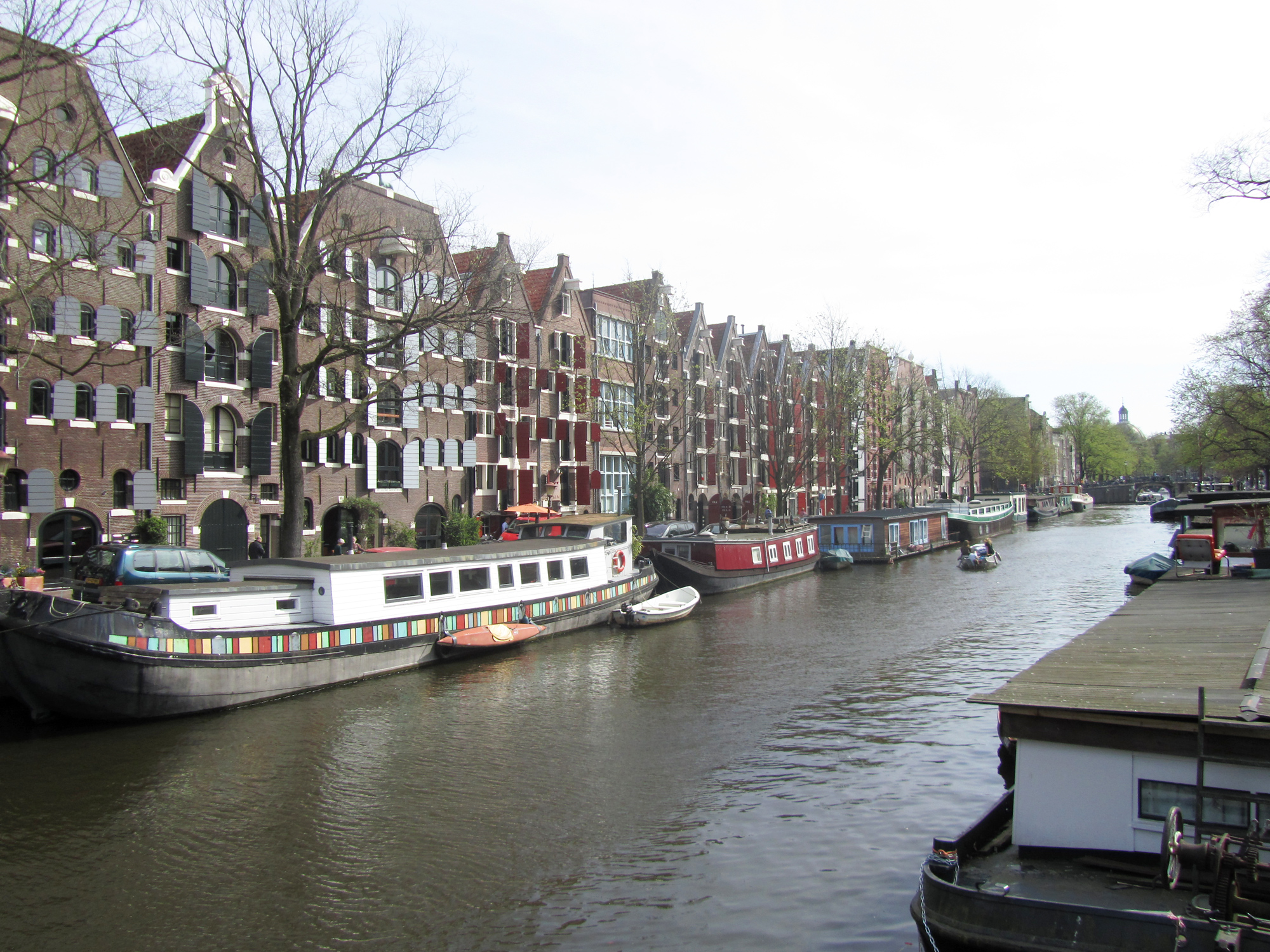
Brouwersgracht

Brouwersgracht is a canal in the city centre of Amsterdam and is part of the canal belt connecting the Singel, Herengracht, Keizergracht and Prinsengracht and marks the northern border of the canal belt. The canal served as a site for ships returning from Asia with spices and silks, therefore Brouwersgracht had many warehouses and storage depots for the ships inventories. Likewise some officials of the Dutch East India Company lived here such as their cartographer (1708–1743) Isaak de Graaf. Breweries were also prevalent in the area due to the access to fresh water shipments. Today the warehouses are now apartments, some of the most expensive in Amsterdam. Houseboats also are seen in the canal. In 2007, Brouwersgracht was voted the most beautiful street in Amsterdam by readers of Het Parool, a national daily newspaper.

=== Kloveniersburgwal ===
Kloveniersburgwal is a canal running south from Nieuwmarkt to the Amstel River on the edge of the medieval city. The east side became populated in the 17th century and has a few grand mansions, like the Trippenhuis, now housing the Royal Netherlands Academy of Arts and Sciences (KNAW). Kloveniersburgwal was popular with administrators at the Dutch East India Company, being close to its nerve center on Oude Hoogstraat and its warehouse.

=== Brantasgracht, Lamonggracht, Majanggracht and Seranggracht ===
These four canals are the newest in Amsterdam, constructed on Java Island in 1995, a manmade island in the IJ Harbor, north-east of the City Center. The canals are lined with modern interpretations of classic Amsterdam canal houses, which were designed by 19 young Dutch architects. Each house is 4.5 meters wide and 4 or 5 stories tall, but the designs are totally unique and are often featured in Amsterdam travel guides despite being off the beaten path of most tourists. Nine ornate metal bridges, designed by artist couple Guy Rombouts and Monika Droste, cross the canals for pedestrians and cyclists.

== See also ==
- Lauriergracht
- Spiegelgracht
