= Spiegelgracht =

Canal in Amsterdam

Coordinates: 52.3619°N 4.88722°E

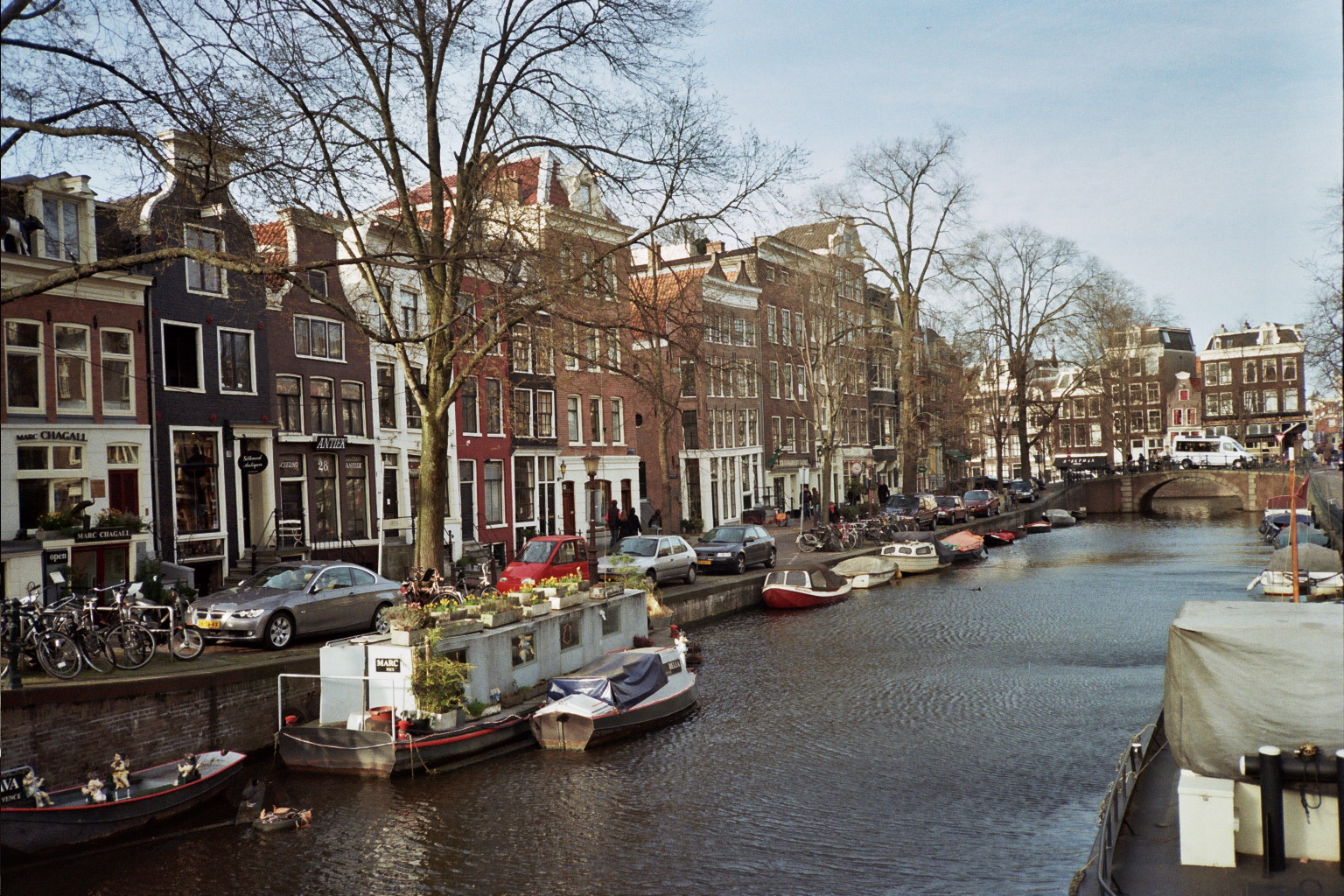
The Spiegelgracht, flowing in the direction of the Prinsengracht

The Spiegelgracht (Dutch: [ˈspi.ɣəlɣrɑxt], mirror canal) is a canal in the centre of Amsterdam, located near the Prinsengracht. Built in the 16th century, it is a part of the Canals of Amsterdam which have been designated as UNESCO World Heritage Sites.
