= Singelgracht =

Canal in Amsterdam

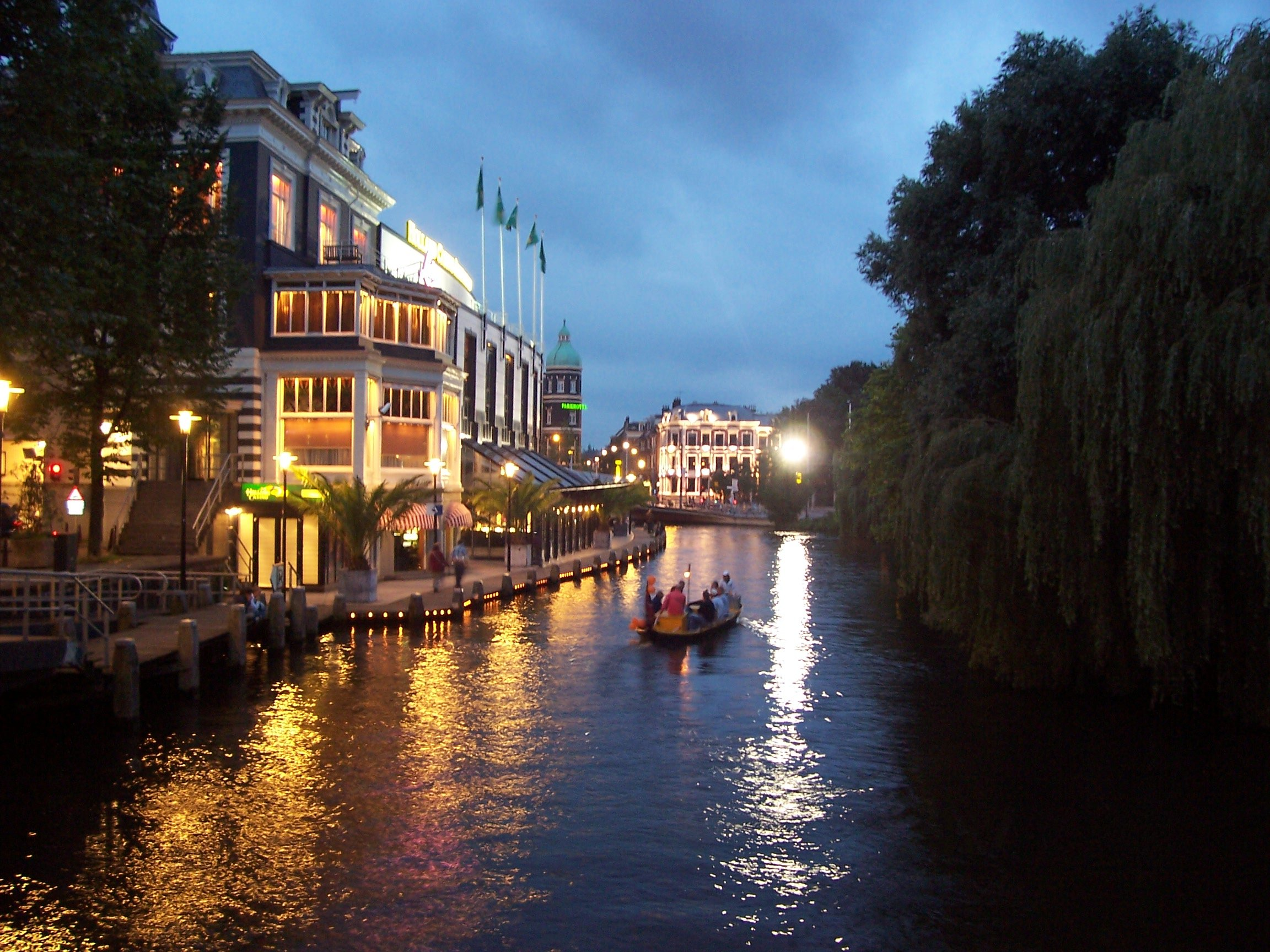
- The Singelgracht at the Stadhouderskade, Holland Casino on the left

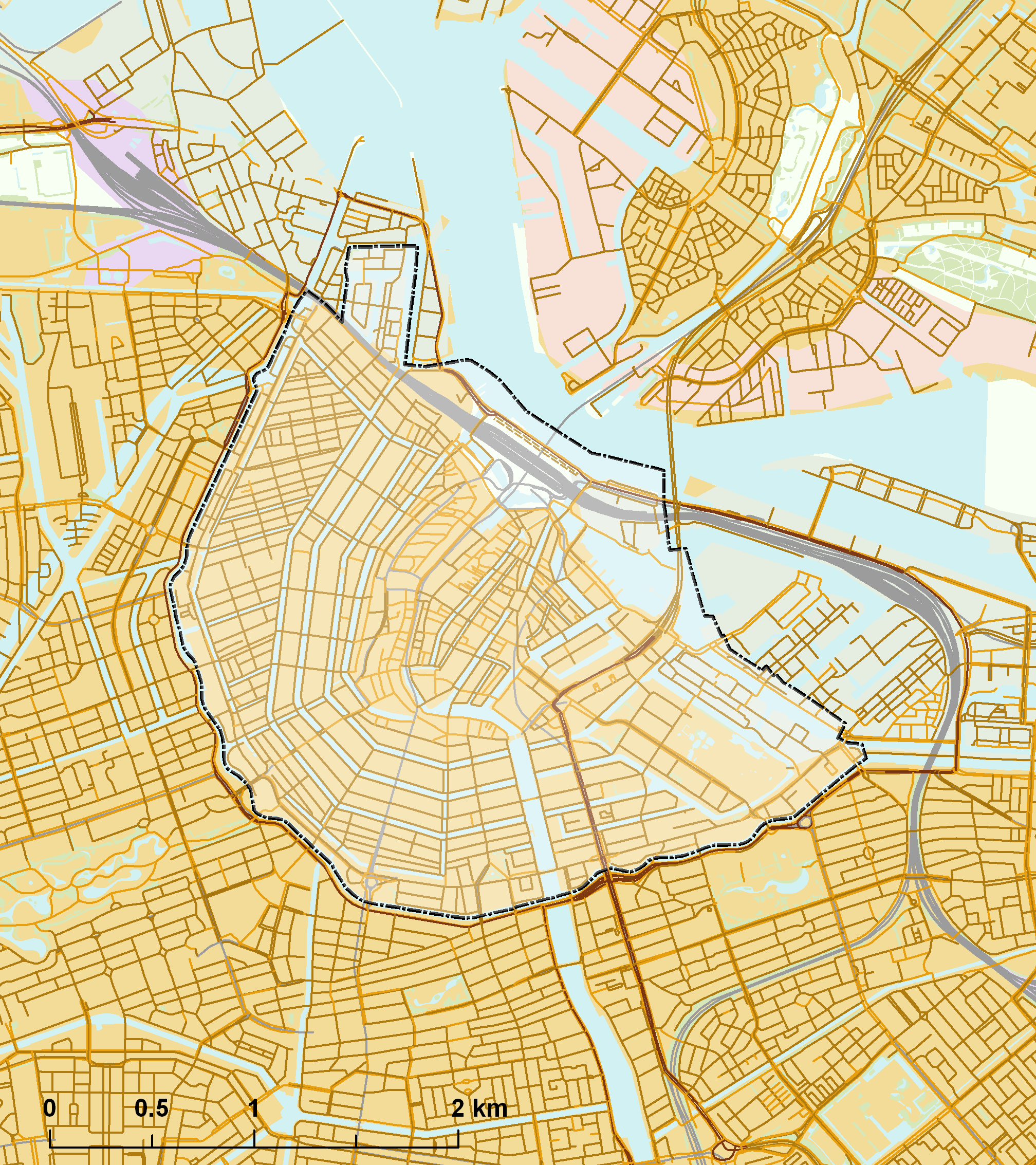
- The Singelgracht surrounds the protected cityscape, indicated in a lighter shade, to the west, south and east.
- Location: Amsterdam
- Postal code: 1015, 1016, 1017, 1018
- Coordinates: 52.384122°N 4.881703°E
- East end: IJ
- To: Eastern Port Area

Construction
- Construction start: 17th century

The Singelgracht (Dutch pronunciation: [ˈsɪŋəlˌɣrɑxt]) is a semi-circular waterway that borders the entire city centre of Amsterdam, Netherlands. The canal runs along the Nassaukade, Stadhouderskade and Mauritskade streets. Formerly part of the ramparts, it formed the outer defenses of the city.

== Name ==
The name is related to the Dutch word omsingelen, "to surround", and comes ultimately from Latin cingulum, meaning "belt". "Gracht" means canal. Other Dutch towns also have ring-shaped canals named Singel or Singelgracht.

The Singelgracht is often confused with another Amsterdam canal, the Singel. The Singel however surrounds the relatively small medieval center of Amsterdam, whereas the Singelgracht surrounds the entire city center, including the famous ring of canals. The name merely applies to the waterway, not to the adjacent built-up quays. The names of the streets on the 'inside' of the semi-circular canal are: Marnixkade, Leidsekade, Nicolaas Witsenkade, Sarphatikade, Huddekade, Spinozastraat and Alexanderkade. On the 'outside' are three major roads: Nassaukade (west), Stadhouderskade (south) and Mauritskade (east). Singelgracht therefore is never part of an address. For this reason the name is less known than that of other canals.

== History ==
After the fourth expansion of the Amsterdam canal ring around 1660, the outer canal – with the ramparts that formed the city defenses – became the new boundary of the city. Within these ramparts there were strongholds on which windmills were built. As a result, the canal had a much more curvier course than these days. Parallel to the Singelgracht, on the inside of the ramparts was the Lijnbaansgracht situated, named after the ropeyards in this area.

For two centuries, Amsterdam kept its characteristic crescent-shaped layout. In the last quarter of the 19th century, the city expanded beyond the Singelgracht. New roads were laid out on the former ramparts: Marnixstraat, Weteringschans and Sarphatistraat. Most of the strongholds or bulwarks (Dutch: "bolwerken") were demolished and the canal was straightened. The former winding course can still be recognized in a few places. Two windmills remain; both however were moved to new locations: De Gooyer to Zeeburgerstraat in Amsterdam-Oost and De Bloem to Haarlemmerweg in Amsterdam-West.

== Bridges ==
The section of the Singelgracht between the Westerkanaal and the Rotterdammerbrug is part of the shipping connection (standing mast route) between the IJ and the Kattensloot / Kostverlorenvaart, with movable bridges on either side of the Willemspoort . The other bridges over the Singelgracht are fixed bridges.

== Gallery ==
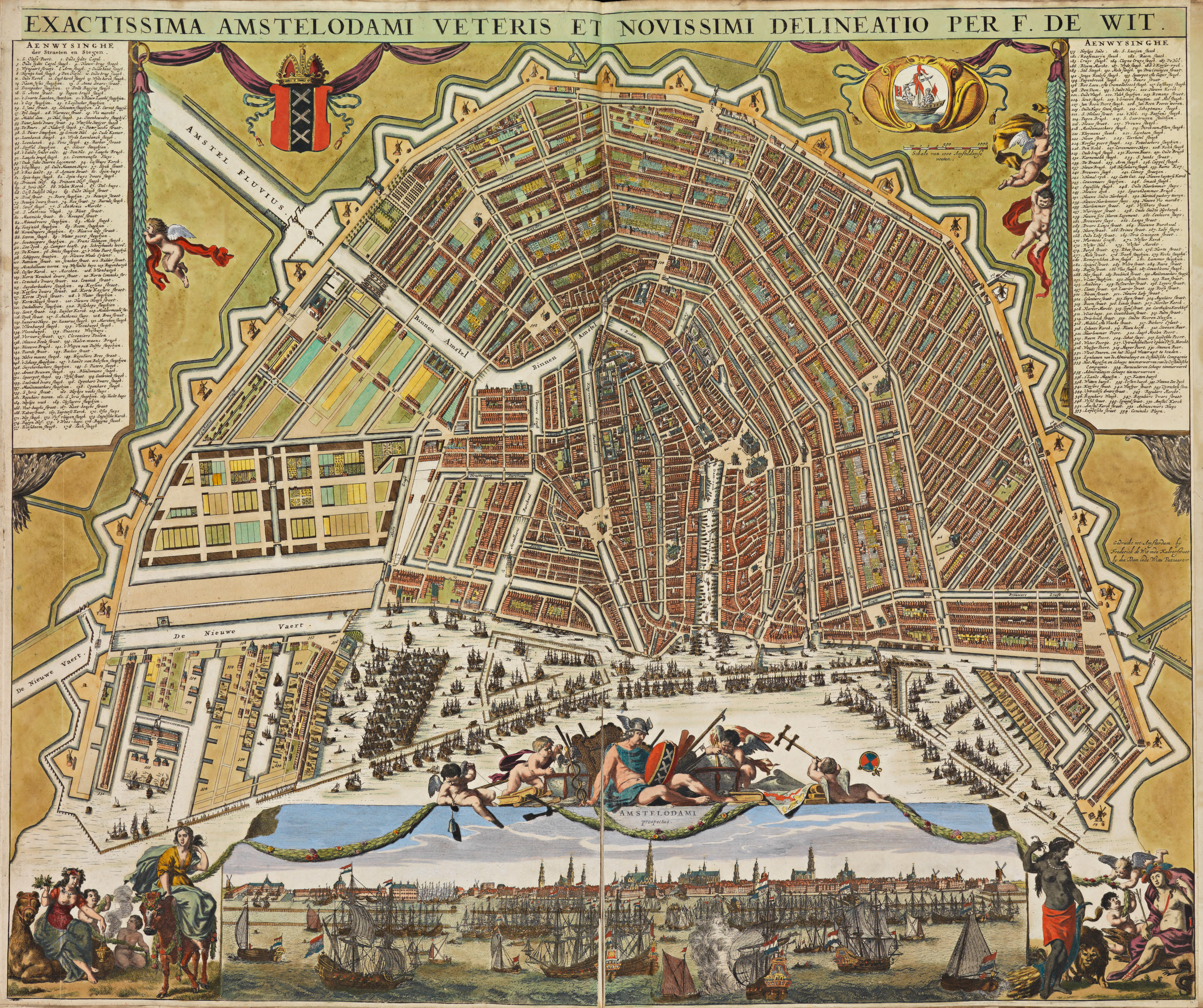
Singelgracht on an upside-down map of c. 1700 (curvy canal along the ramparts)

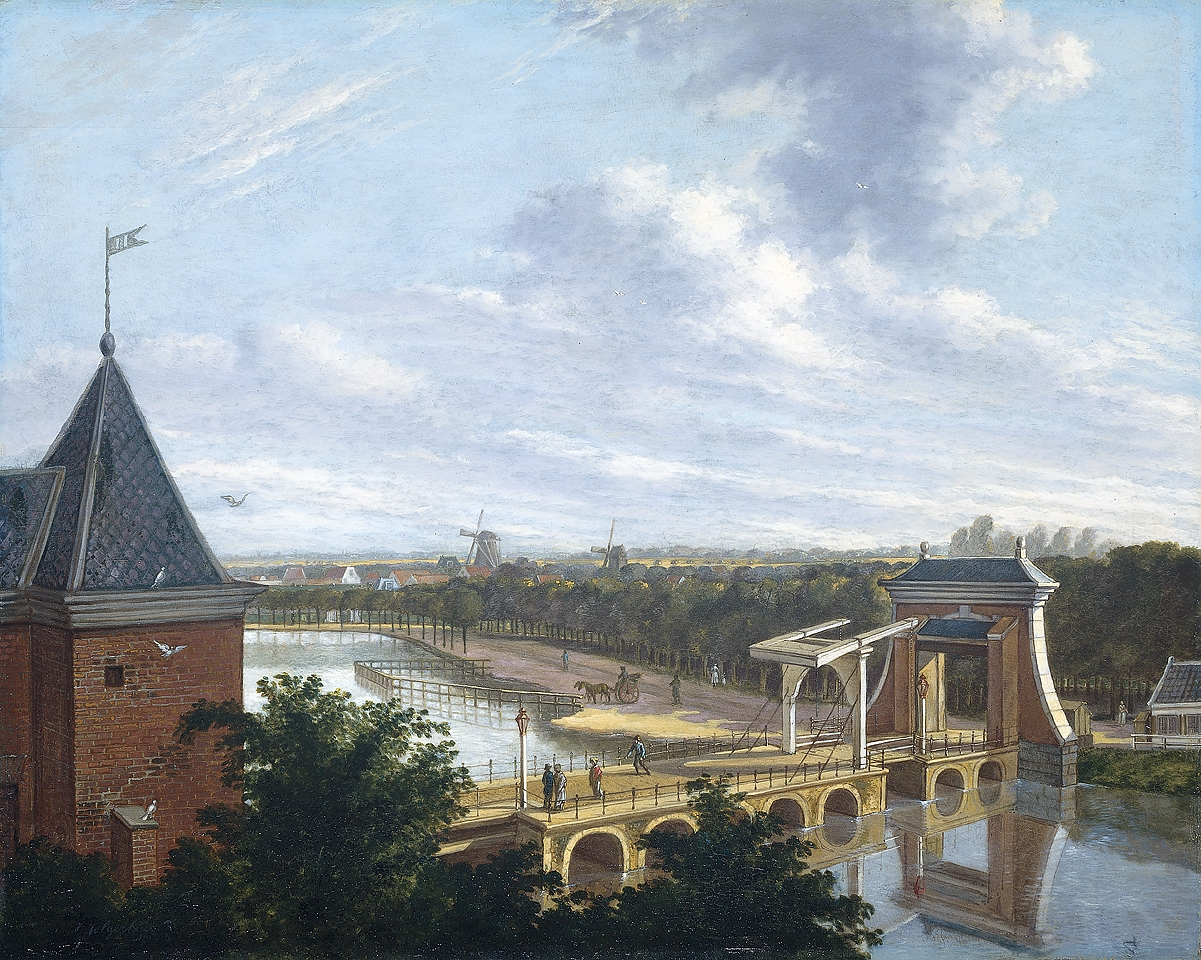
Painting from 1816 by Johannes Jelgerhuis, showing Singelgracht near Leidsepoort

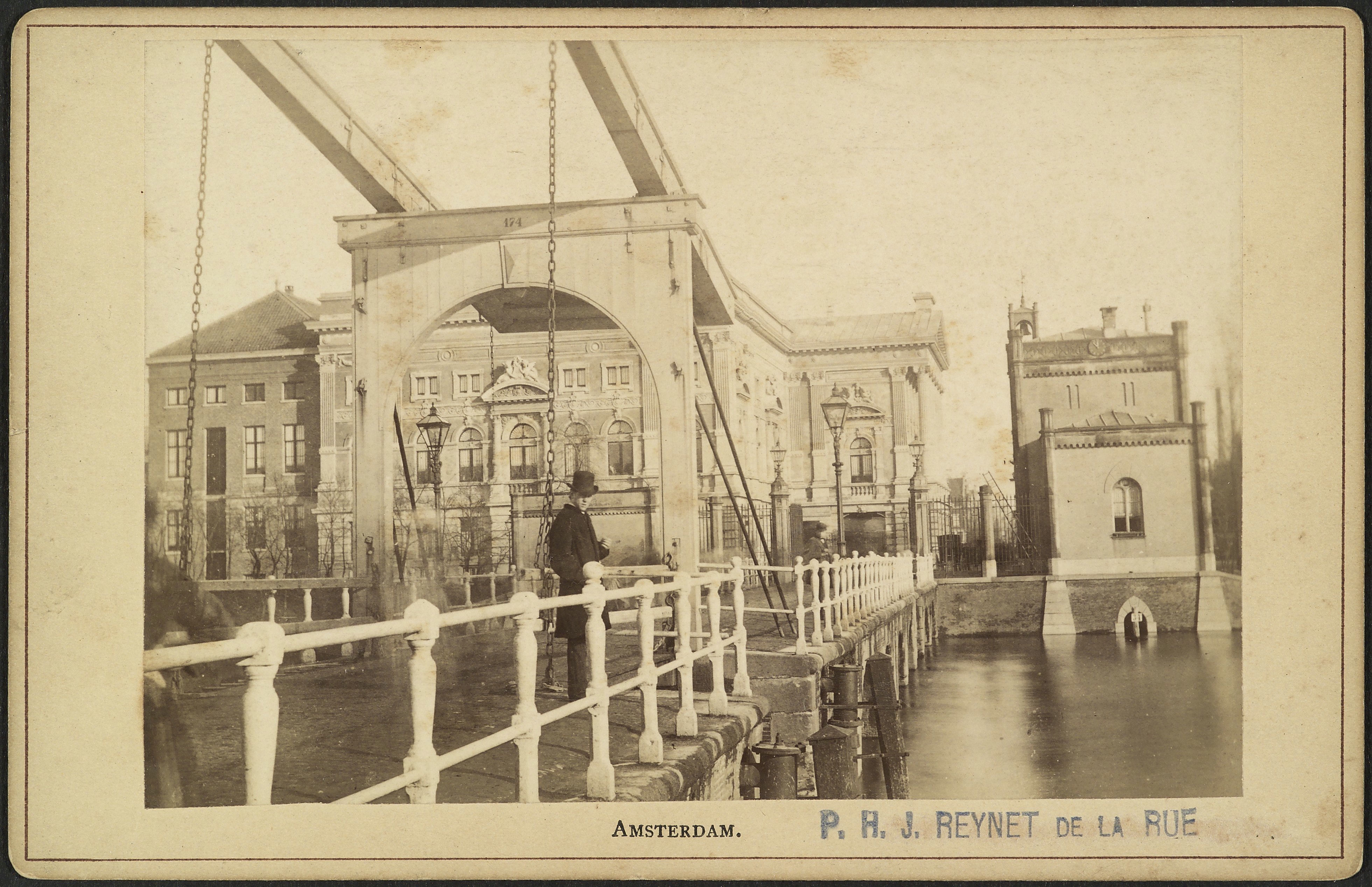
Drawbridge over Singelgracht at Leidsebosje with the old Stadsschouwburg theater in the background

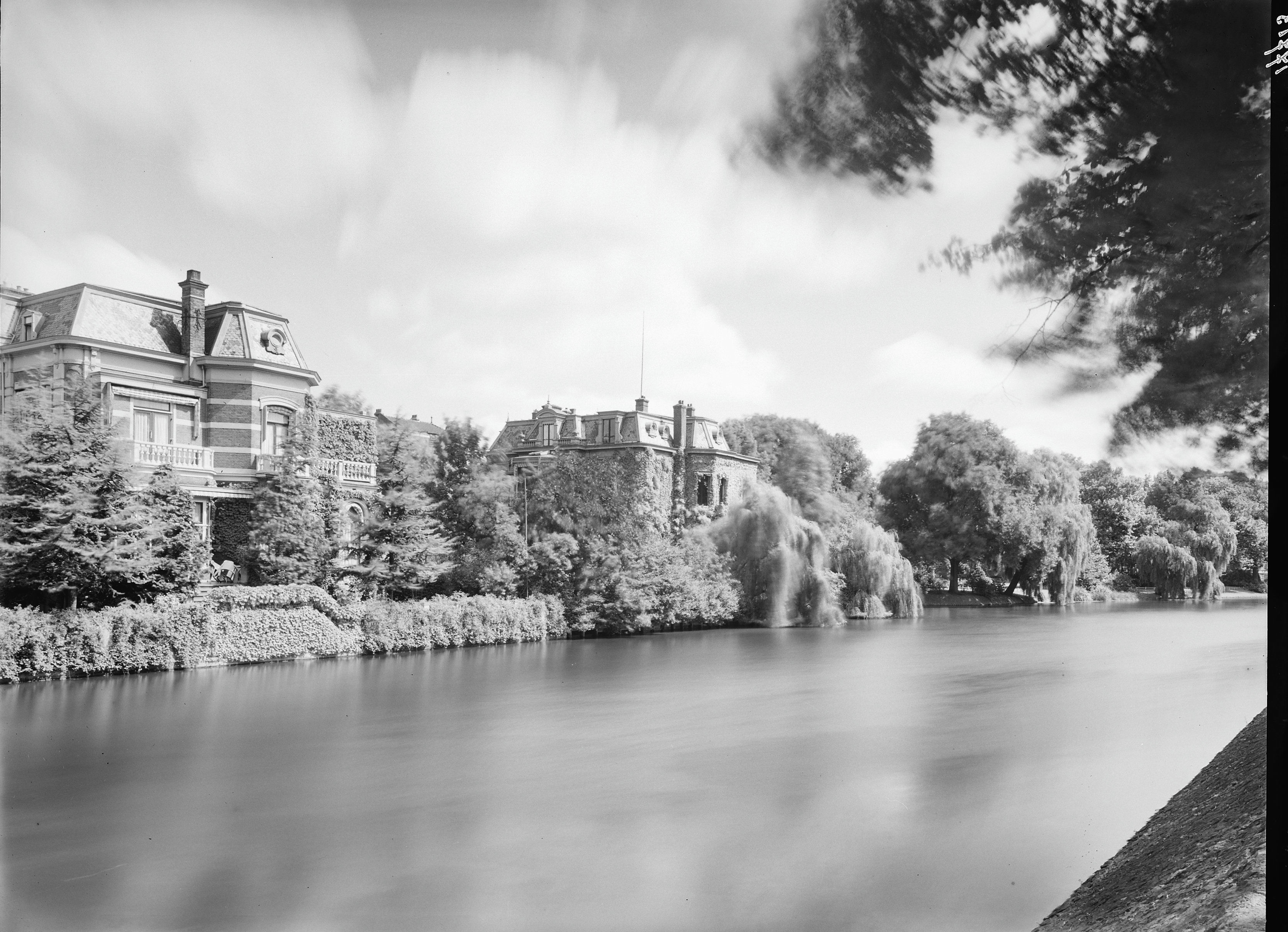
Demolished villas along Singelgracht, in the 1960s replaced by office buildings ("salt & pepper dispensers")

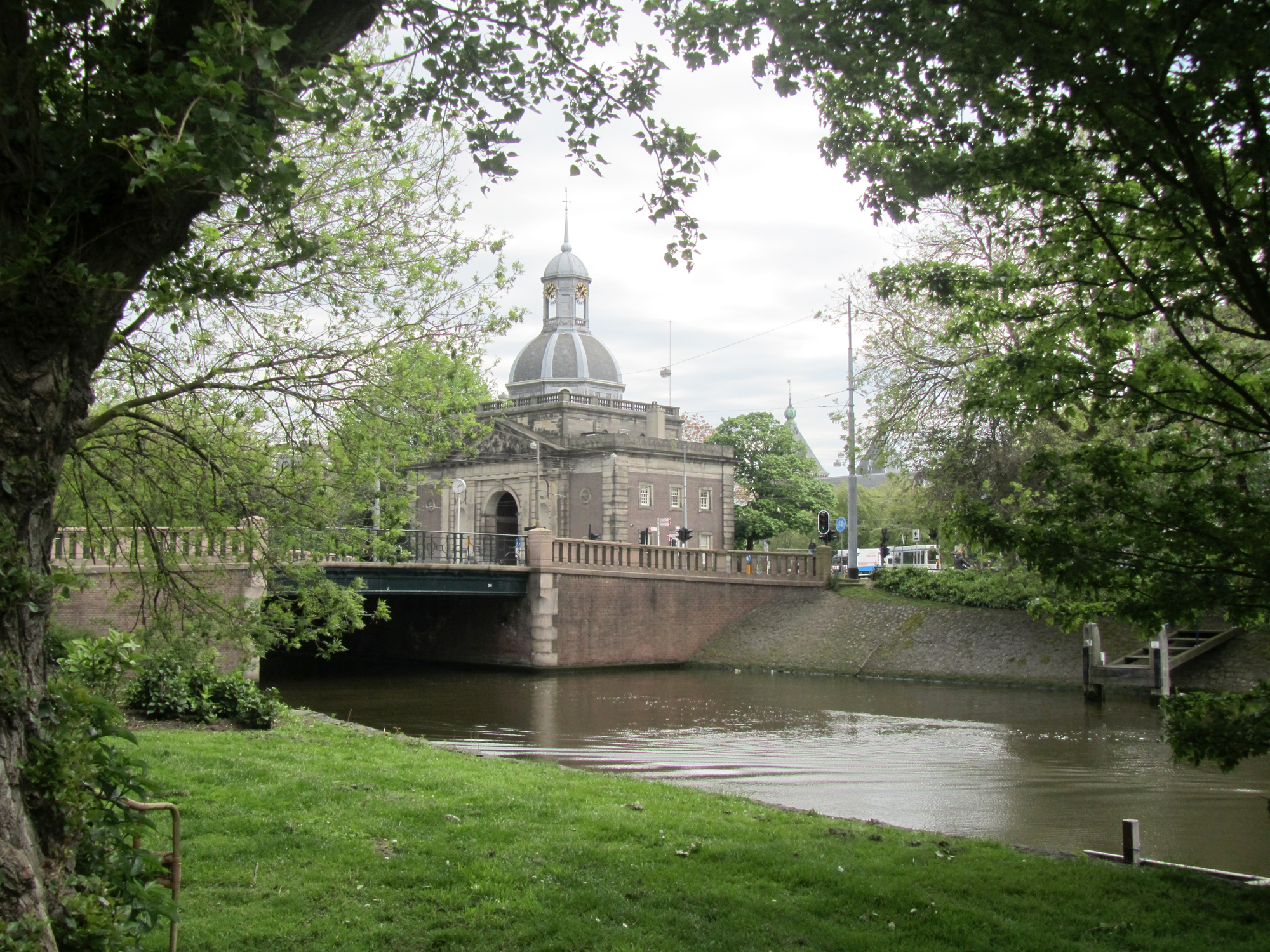
Muiderpoort as seen from Singelgracht

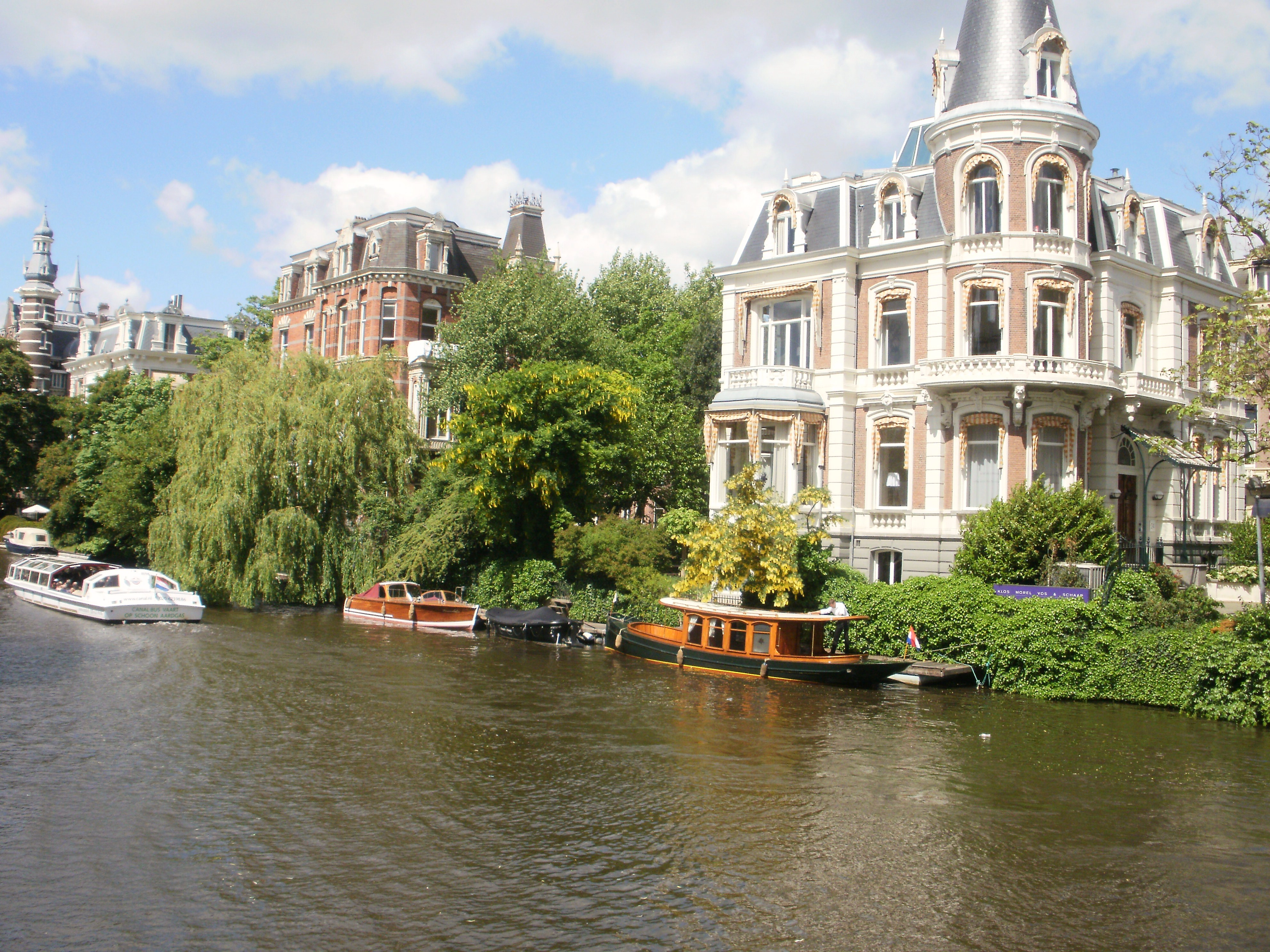
Late 19th-century villas along Weteringschans opposite Rijksmuseum, here seen from Singelgracht

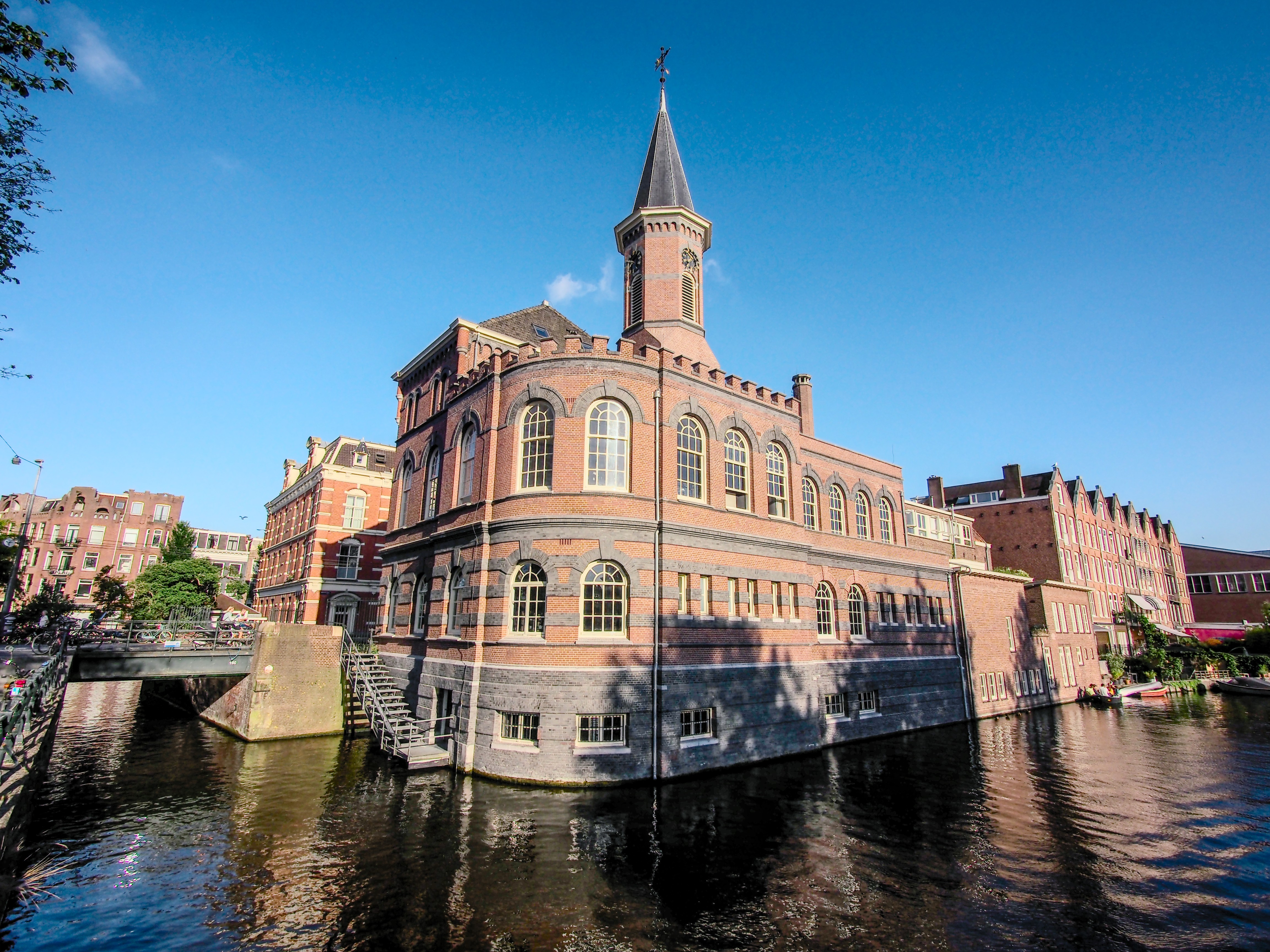
Raampoort police station, Marnixstraat 148, here seen from Singelgracht

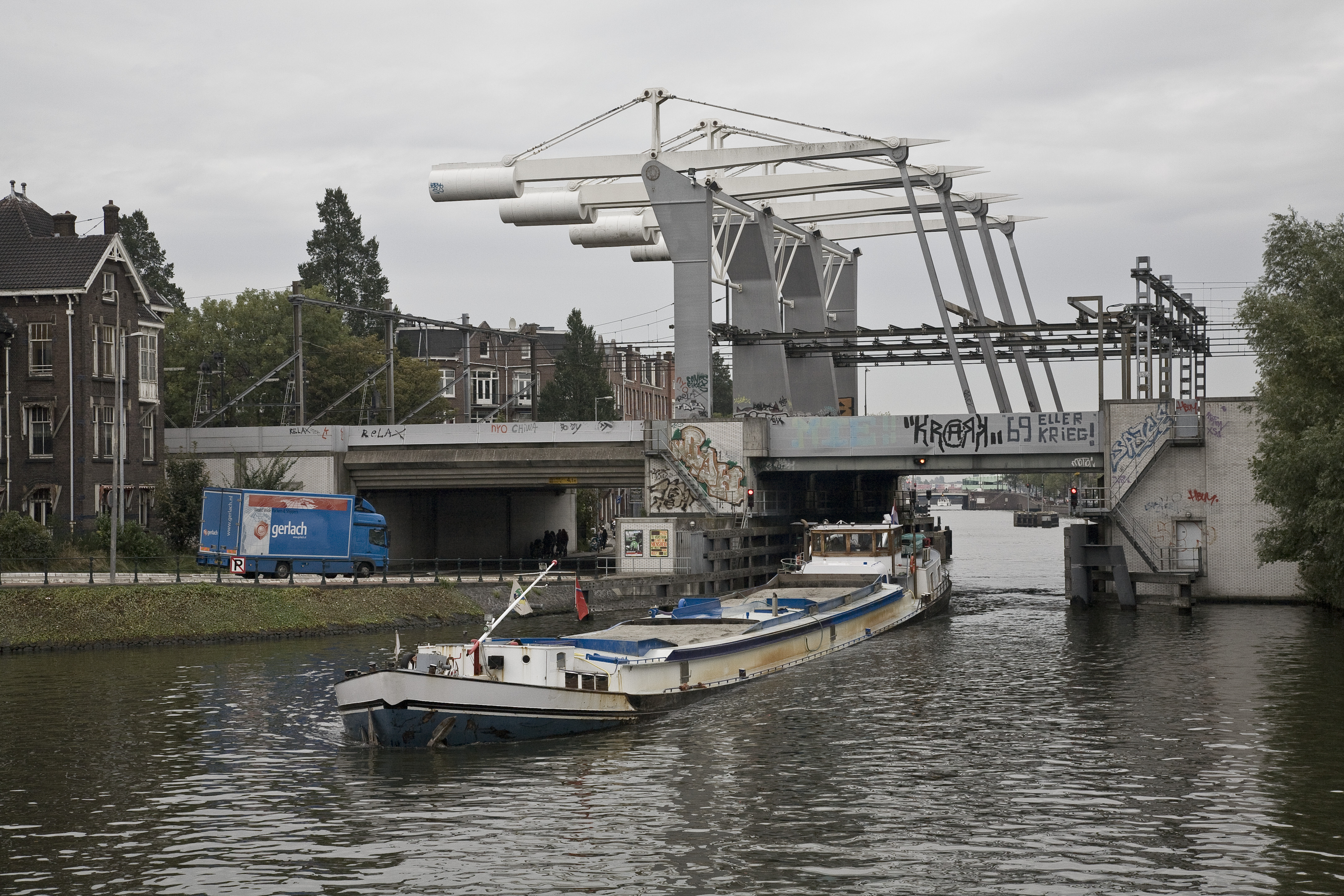
Railway bridge over Singelgracht between Central Station and Sloterdijk station

== See also ==
- Canals of Amsterdam
