= Nieuwe Achtergracht =

Canal in Amsterdam

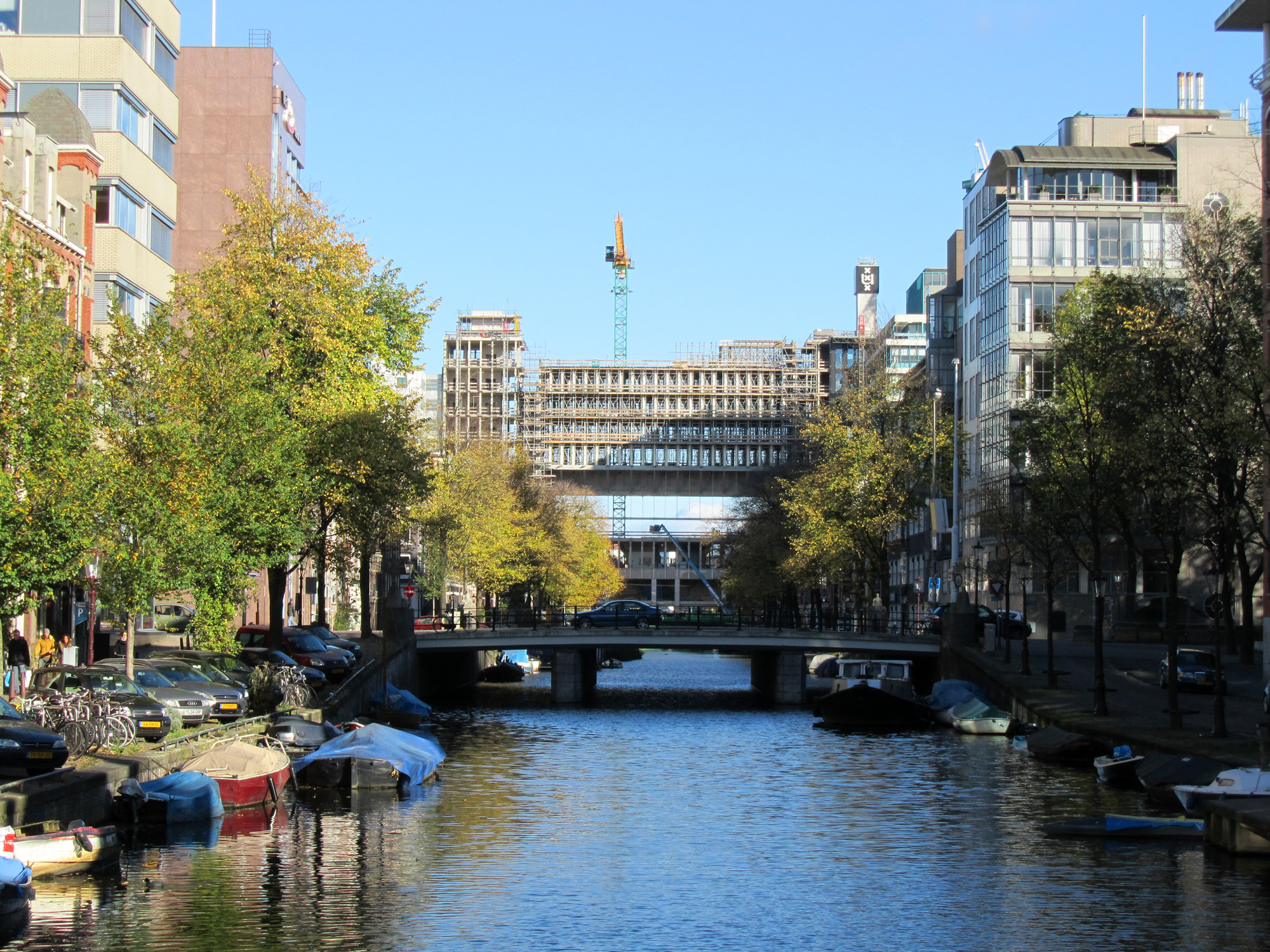
- View of the Nieuwe Achtergracht. On the Roeterseiland (background) a new university building will be built over the canal. In front of it is bridge no. 260.

- Location of Nieuwe Achtergracht (dark blue)
- Location: Amsterdam
- Postal code: 1018
- Coordinates: 52.3639°N 4.8958°E
- East end: Plantage Muidergracht

The Nieuwe Achtergracht is a canal in Amsterdam in the east of the Grachtengordel (canal belt) in the Amsterdam-Centrum district. It runs parallel to the Nieuwe Prinsengracht and connects the Onbekendegracht with the Plantage Muidergracht. The canal is crossed by Weesperstraat (at the Weesperplein) and Roetersstraat.

== History ==
The Achtergracht is a short canal near Frederiksplein, located west of the Amstel. The Nieuwe Achtergracht was constructed as an extension of the Achtergracht during the last expansion of the canal belt east of the Amstel. This extension was in the prosperous part of Amsterdam's Jodenbuurt (Jewish quarter).

== Architecture ==
- The Diamond Exchange from 1910, on the corner of the Nieuwe Achtergracht / Weesperplein, was designed by Gerrit van Arkel.
- The former nursing home of the Joodse Invalide association is located on the corner of Weesperplein on Nieuwe Achtergracht 100. Nowadays the GGD Amsterdam has its headquarters here.
- The former main barracks of the Amsterdam fire brigade are located on Nieuwe Achtergracht 26-34.
- The modern buildings of the University of Amsterdam are located on the eastern part of Roeterseiland near Roetersstraat.

Since 2017, there are five bridges over the Nieuwe Achtergracht:

- The monumental cast-iron bridge no. 252 (Nieuwe Achtergracht / Onbekendegracht) dates from 1900, renamed in 2016 as Diamantbewerkersbrug (Diamond Working Bridge).
- Dr. Meijer de Hondbrug (Bridge No. 257) (Nieuwe Achtergracht / Weesperstraat) bears the name of Rabbi Dr. Meijer de Hond.
- The Halverstad Bridge, bridge no. 260, (Nieuwe Achtergracht / Roetersstraat) is named after the economist and resistance fighter Felix Halverstad.
- The Derkje Hazewinkel-Suringabrug is a pedestrian bridge on the site / campus of the University of Amsterdam, Roeterseiland (built in 2017).
- Bridge No. 169P is a pedestrian bridge; in line with it is bridge no. 116P over the Plantage Muidergracht.
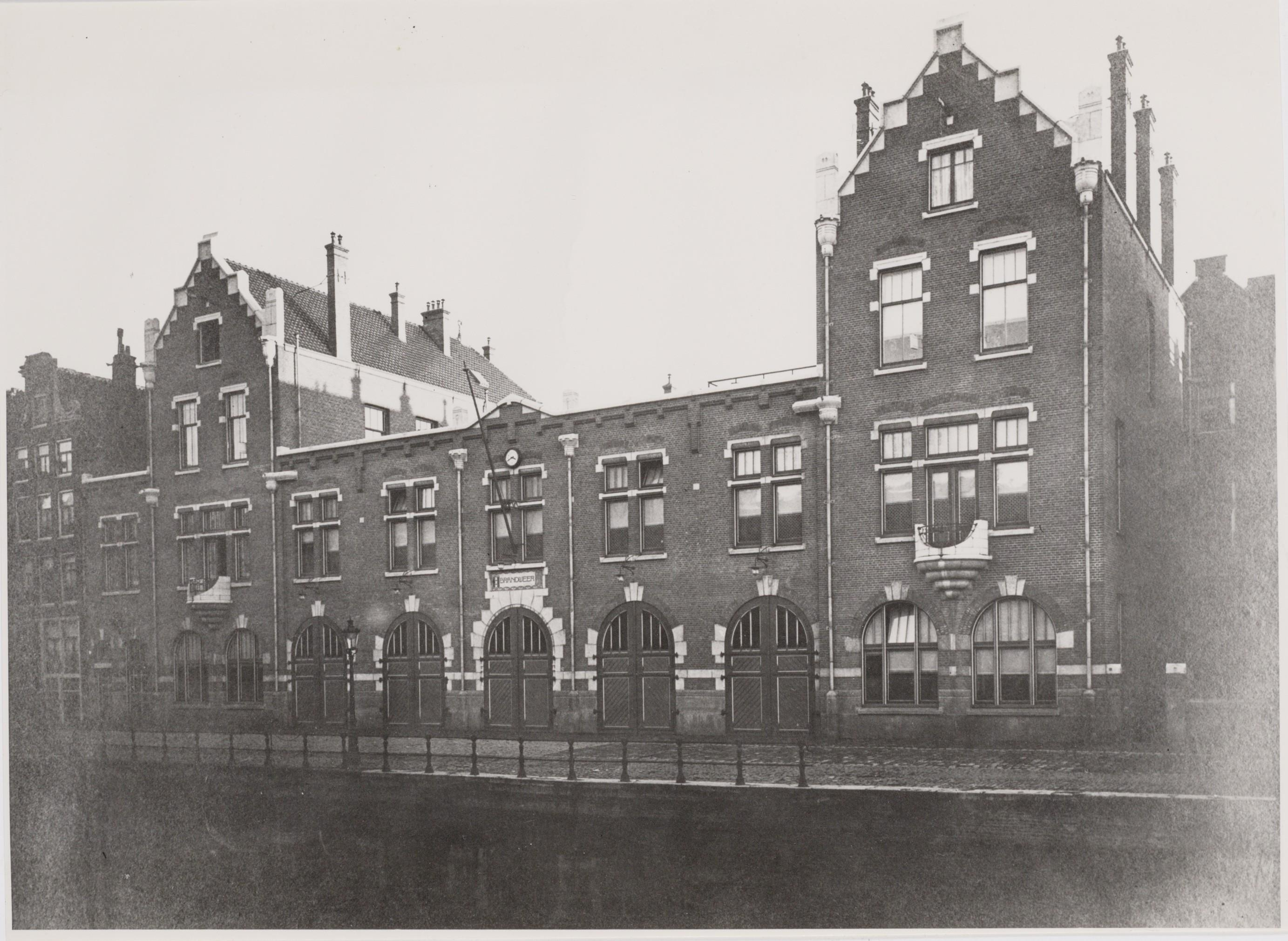
Nieuwe Achtergracht 26-34 before 1900

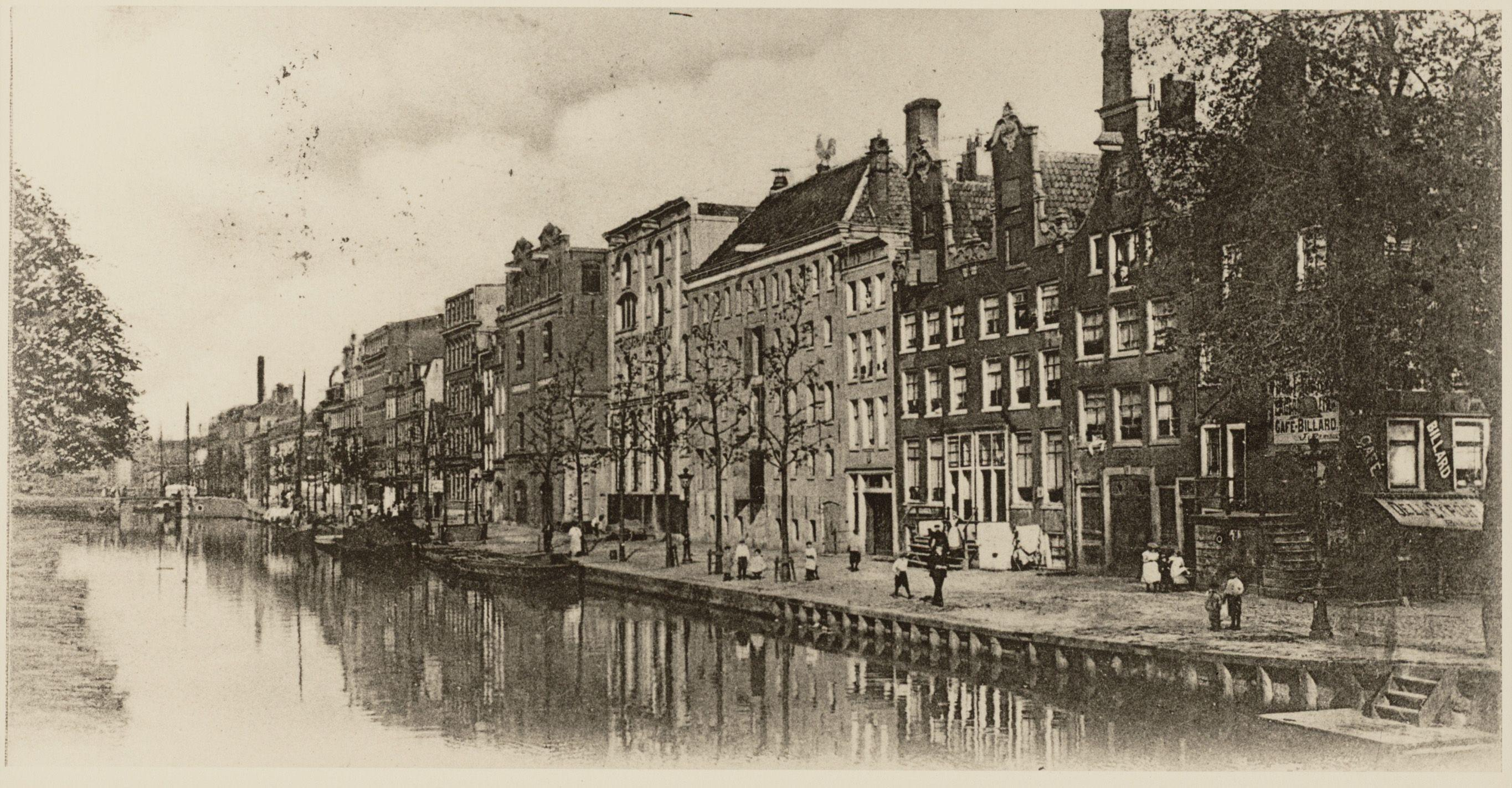
Nieuwe Achtergracht c. 1920

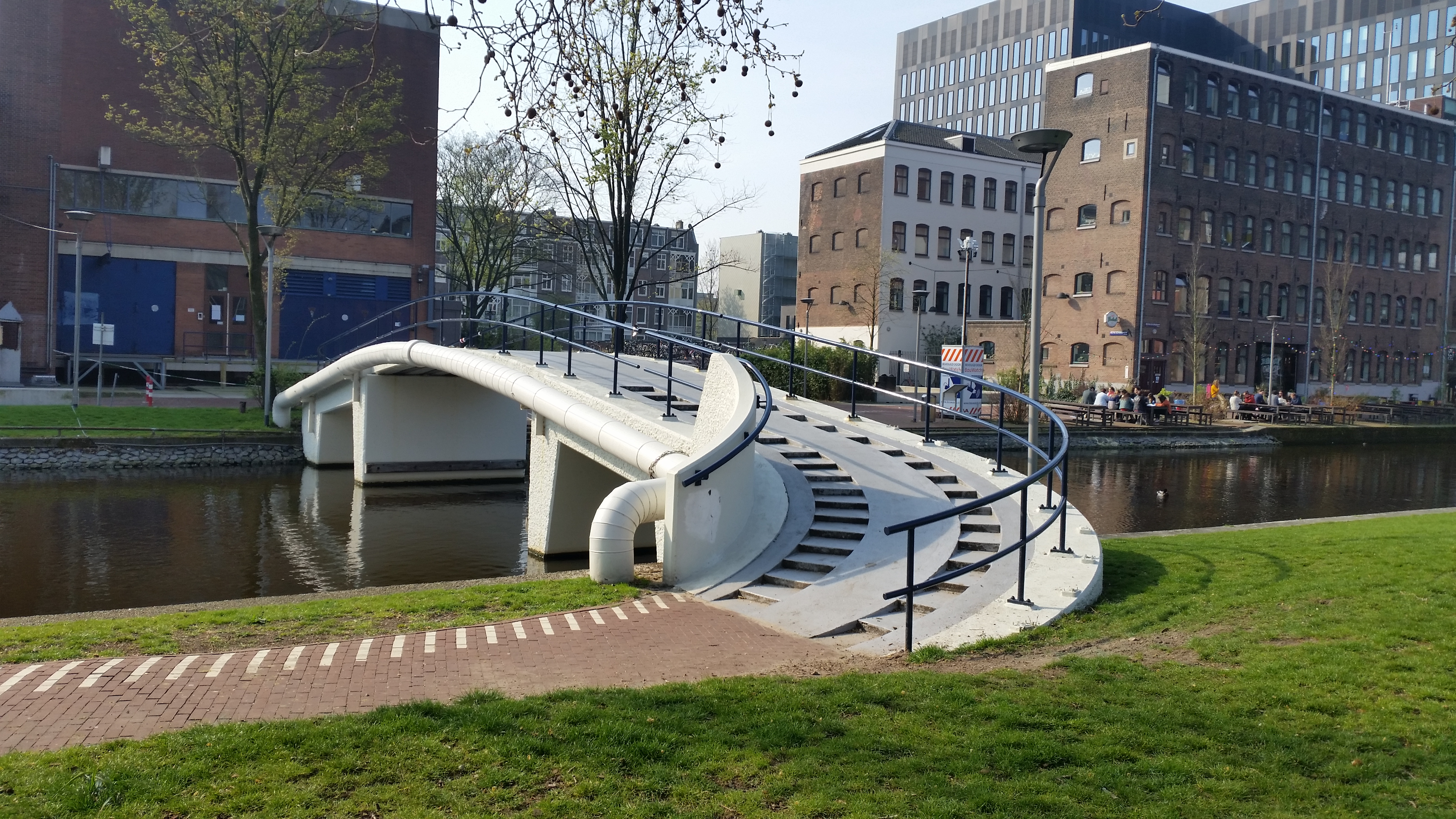
Bridge 169P, Theodore Limpergbrug

== See also ==
- Canals of Amsterdam
