= Achtergracht =

Canal in Amsterdam

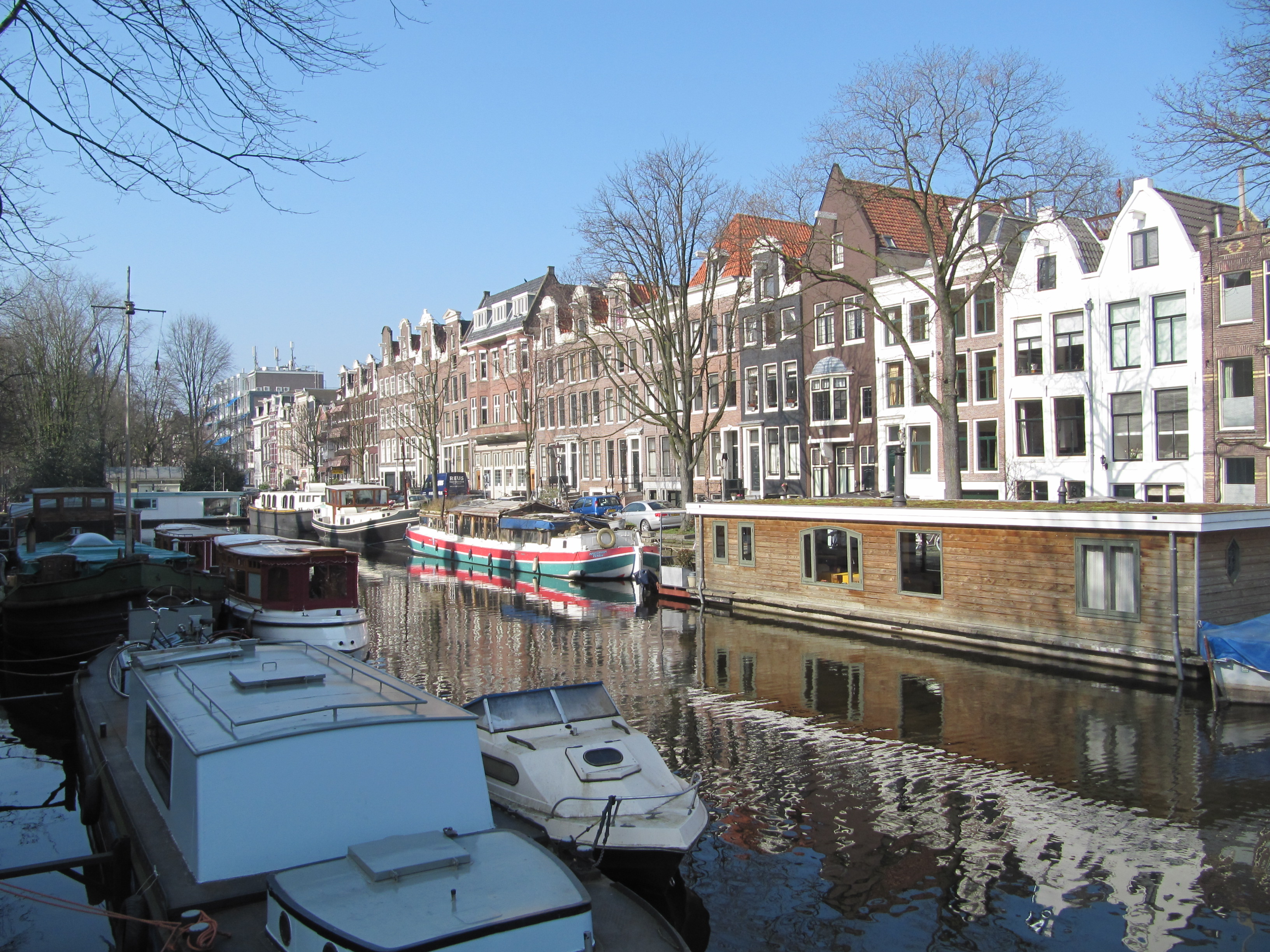
- North side seen from the bridge at the Amstel

- Location within Amsterdam
- Location: Amsterdam
- Postal code: 1017
- Coordinates: 52.361304°N 4.901386°E
- West end: Frederiksplein
- To: Amstel

The Achtergracht (Dutch pronunciation: [ˈɑxtərˌɣrɑxt]) is a short canal in Amsterdam, located between Frederiksplein and the Amstel, parallel to the Prinsengracht. The Achtergracht is located in the eastern part of the Grachtengordel (canal belt).

== History ==
The original Achtergracht was dug around 1660 and connected the Reguliersgracht with the Amstel. The canal can also be seen on the map of the city that city architect Daniël Stalpaert made in 1662, named Achter Graft. Three bridges were laid over the canal. The first was in the eastern quay of the Reguliersgracht, a second in Utrechtsestraat and a third in the western quay of the Amstel. In 1870 most of the canal was filled in, with the first two bridges becoming redundant. The filled-in part now forms the Falckstraat and the north side of the Frederiksplein.

At the last extension of the canal belt east of the Amstel in the direction of the IJ, the Nieuwe Achtergracht was constructed as an extension of the Achtergracht.

== Architecture ==
The façade walls along both the odd-numbered side (northern quay) and the even-numbered side (southern quay) consist almost entirely of municipal or national monuments. At numbers 2-26 Achtergracht there are examples of warehouses. They are called The Sun, and January to December. This is an example of a warehouse row, which is also found on the Brouwersgracht or the Prinsengracht.

== Legend ==
A folk tale has circulated for centuries about the origin of the names of the so-called Calendar warehouses on the Achtergracht. Indeed, there are 13 properties of which 12 are named after the calendar months. A skipper who had his ships on the Achtergracht always had problems with his ships being released at night. He lay down on guard and saw that this was being done by elves playing. He captured one and the elf then promised the skipper that she would give him 20 gold pieces if he let her go. The skipper let the elf go and got his reward. With this he built the warehouses which he named 12 after the months of the year. He named the thirteenth storehouse after the elf who had given him the gold. Her name was Sun and this name is still on the thirteenth warehouse.

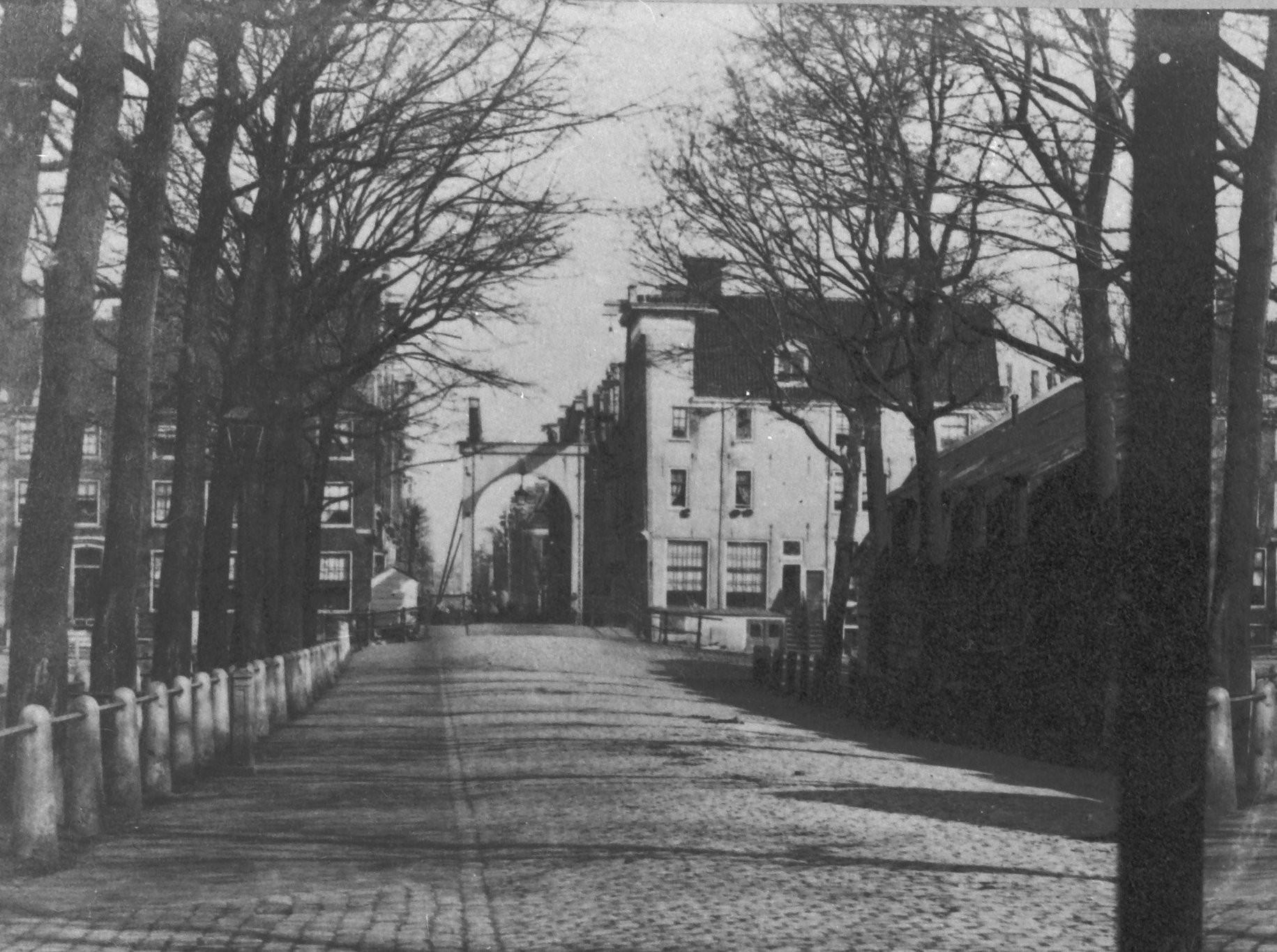
The bridge in Utrechtsestraat over the Achtergracht (1858)

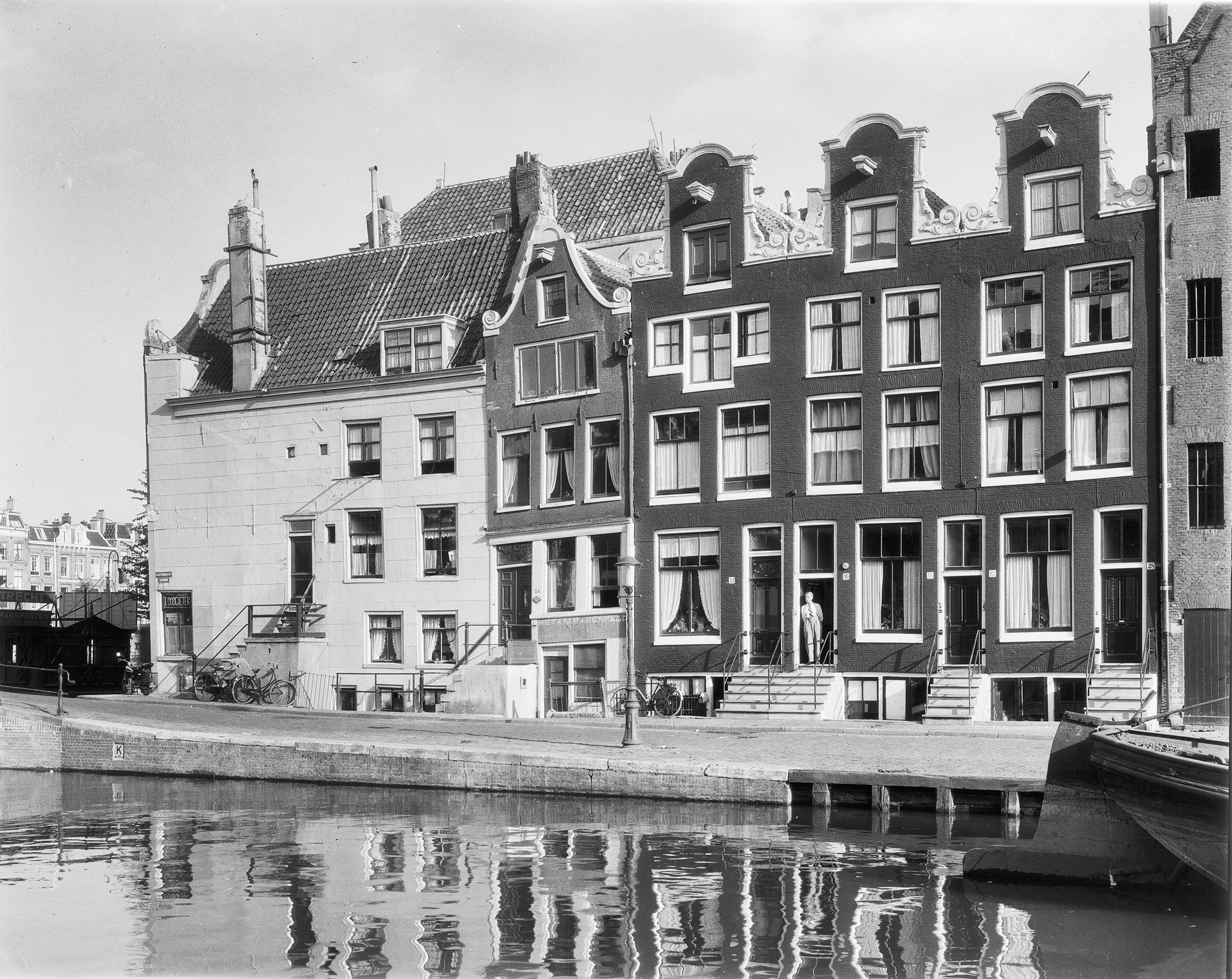
Facades on the Achtergracht at the corner of the Amstel (1955)

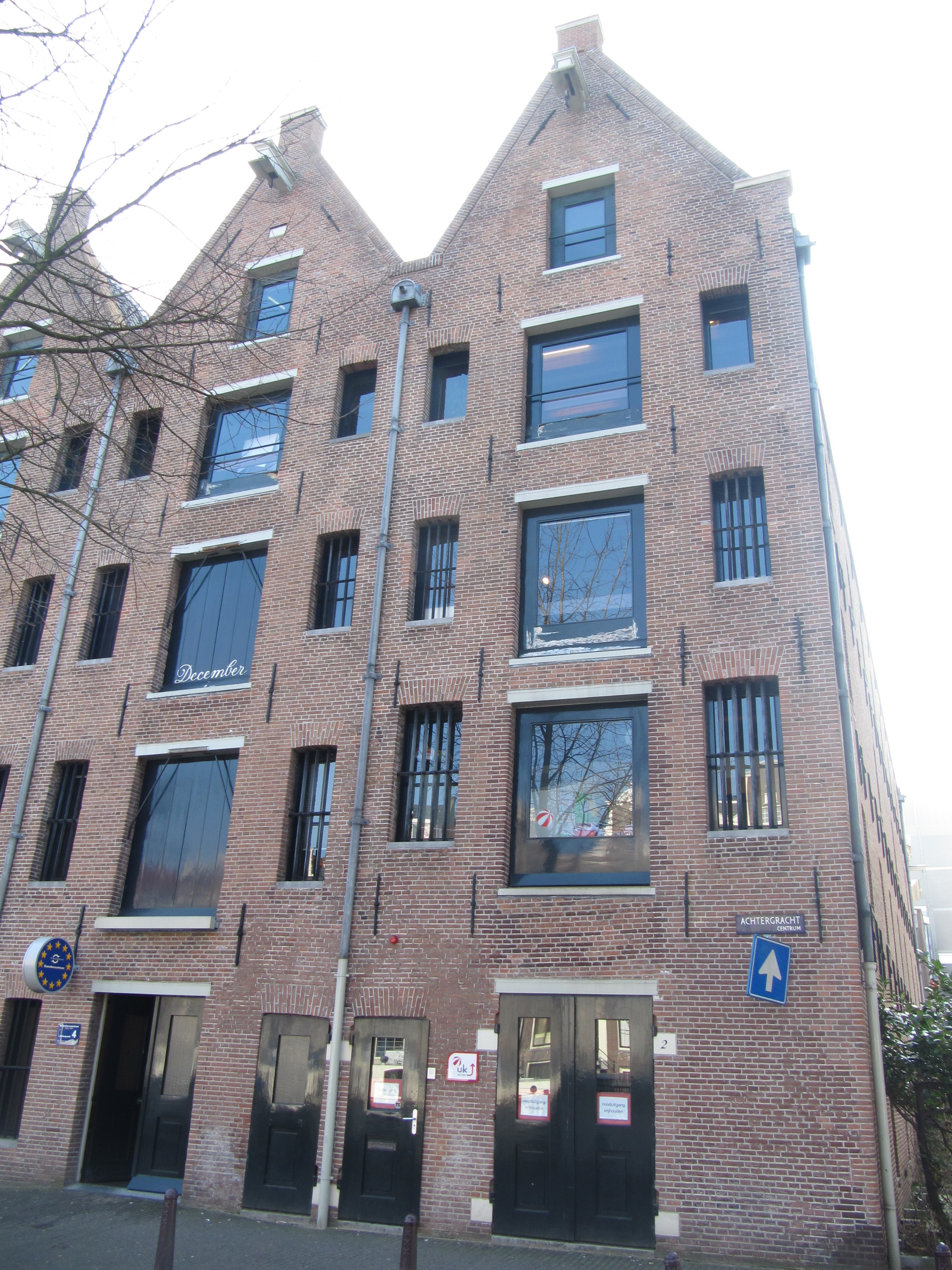
Achtergracht 2-4 (2012)

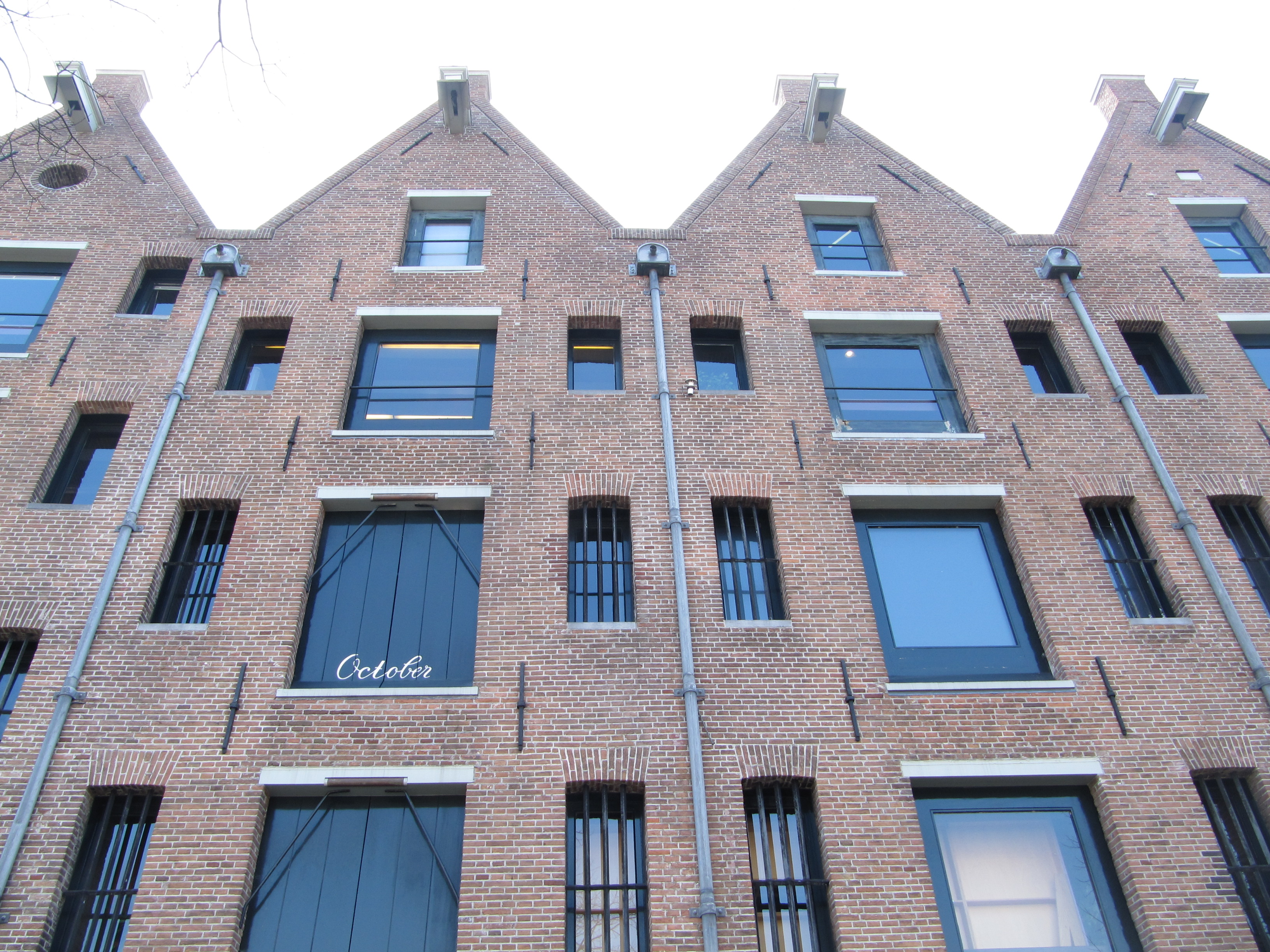
Achtergracht 6-8 (2012)

== See also ==
- Canals of Amsterdam
