= Amsterdam University Press =

Academic publisher

- Status: Private, for-profit (since 2019)
- Founded: 1992
- Founder: University of Amsterdam
- Headquarters location: Nieuwe Prinsengracht 89, Amsterdam, Netherlands
- Distribution: Centraal Boekhuis (Netherlands and Belgium); Baker & Taylor Publisher Services (North America); Ingram Publisher Services (rest of world)
- Key people: Jan-Peter Wissink (owner & CEO)
- Nonfiction topics: Scholarly journals; humanities; social sciences; Asian studies
- Official website: en.aup.nl

Amsterdam University Press (AUP) is a university press that was founded in 1992 by the University of Amsterdam (UvA) in the Netherlands. It is based on the university press model and originally operated on a not-for-profit basis, but was later privatized. AUP publishes scholarly and trade titles in both Dutch and English, predominantly in the humanities and social sciences and formerly had a publishing list of over 1400 titles prior to the 2025 sale of most of its backlist to Taylor & Francis. It also publishes multiple scholarly journals according to the open access publishing model. From 2000 until 2013, the AUP published the journal Academische Boekengids (Academic Book Guide) with book reviews written by editors from multiple Dutch universities.

In 2019, the University of Amsterdam sold AUP to a private individual, who was allowed to continue using the public university's name and logo. In 2025, AUP sold most of its English academic book list to for-profit publisher Taylor & Francis, prompting the resignation of a number of series editors who argued that taxpayer-funded scholarship was being exploited for private gain.

== Objectives ==
AUP makes use of the peer reviewing system: submissions are assessed by an editorial board of expert scholars from Dutch and Flemish universities. AUP explicitly supports open access, and combines in its publishing policy the use of repositories and print-on-demand provisions with traditional printing. AUP is one of thirteen publishers to participate in the Knowledge Unlatched pilot, a global library consortium approach to funding open access books.

== Areas of publishing ==
AUP's backlist comprised a number of different academic disciplines, including language and literature, archaeology, management studies, cultural studies, film and media, art and art history, music and theatre studies, as well as social sciences, ranging from migration and integration to Asian studies. In addition, AUP is active in educational publishing for high school and higher education, as well as popular science.

== Imprints ==
Various imprints are linked to AUP. Vossiuspers UvA publishes the works of the University of Amsterdam's scholars and all inaugural lectures of UvA professors. In 2004, under the name Pallas Publications, AUP began a new service allowing authors, institutions, and organizations to have their academic publications produced, distributed, and promoted.

== Notable books ==
- Islam on the Move by Farish A. Noor
