= Onbekendegracht =

Canal in Amsterdam

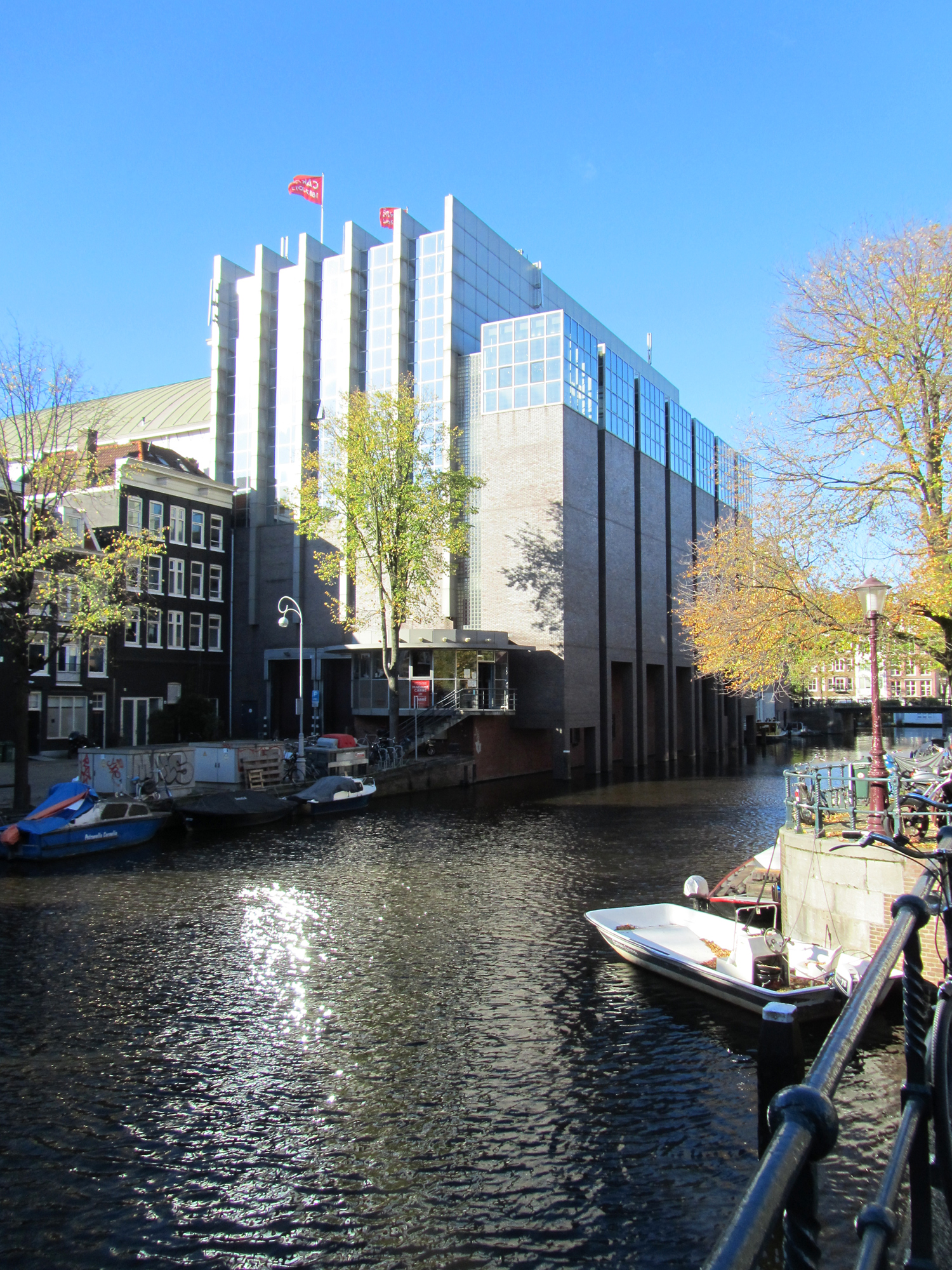
- Onbekendegracht with the rear of Theater Carré

- Location of the canal (dark blue)
- Location: Amsterdam
- Postal code: 1018
- Coordinates: 52.362505°N 4.904795°E
- North end: Nieuwe Prinsengracht
- To: Nieuwe Achtergracht

The Onbekendegracht (Unknown Canal) is a short canal in Amsterdam, in the eastern part of the Grachtengordel (canal belt).

== Location ==
The Onbekendegracht, which connects the Nieuwe Prinsengracht and the Nieuwe Achtergracht, is located directly behind the Royal Theater Carré in the Weesperbuurt. The cast iron bridge no. 252, built in 1899, connects Nieuwe Achtergracht with the Onbekendegracht. This pedestrian bridge is one of the 72 municipal monuments in the form of a bridge. The buildings at Onbekendegracht 1–5, built in 1906 and designed by AJ Tymensen, became a monument in 2006. Also bridge no. 253 is over the Onbekendegracht.

== Name ==
The Onbekendegracht originally gave the Voormalige Stadstimmertuin street access to the Amstel. In a notarial deed drawn up in 1800 the canal was called "the Onbekende or Amstelgragtje". The name Korte Amstelgrachtje was also in vogue. The name means 'unknown canal'. In 1948, residents of the Onbekendegracht asked the municipality of Amsterdam to change the name of the canal because they found it too confusing. However, the request was not granted.

== Mill ==
The impressionist Claude Monet painted a canvas in 1871 entitled "Le Moulin de l'Onbekende Gracht, Amsterdam" on which the "Rooseboom" mill is depicted. This 17th-century mill stood between the Amstel and the Onbekendegracht. In the course of time the mill was also called "Binnen Tuchthuismolen", "Het Land van Beloften" or "de Eendracht". In Monet's time, woods such as Paubrasilia were ground by the mill for the production of dyes. The mill was demolished in 1876 to make room for construction of the Carré theater.

Monet's painting can be seen in the Museum of Fine Arts, Houston.

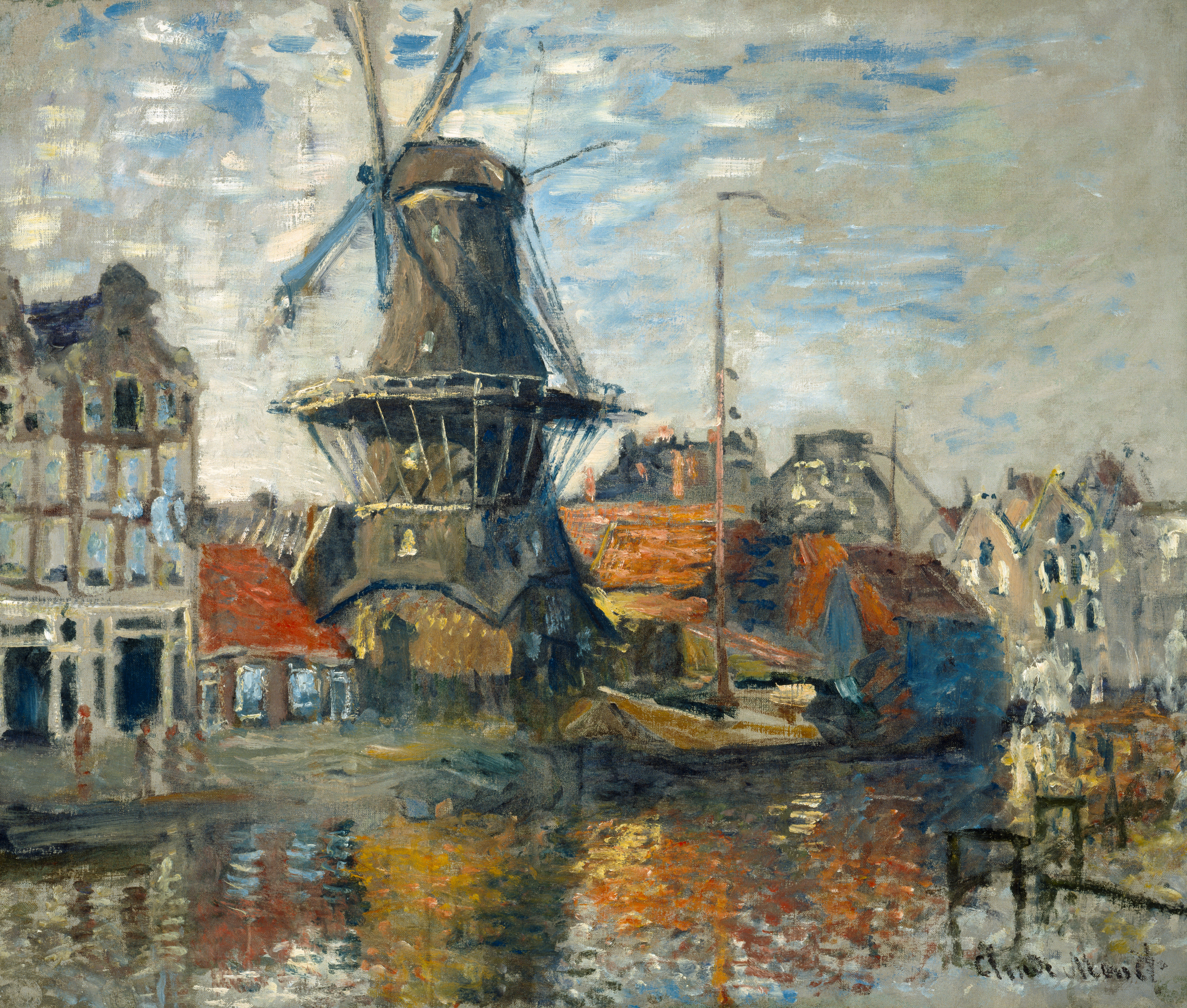
Claude Monet - Le Moulin de l'Onbekende Gracht, Amsterdam, 1871

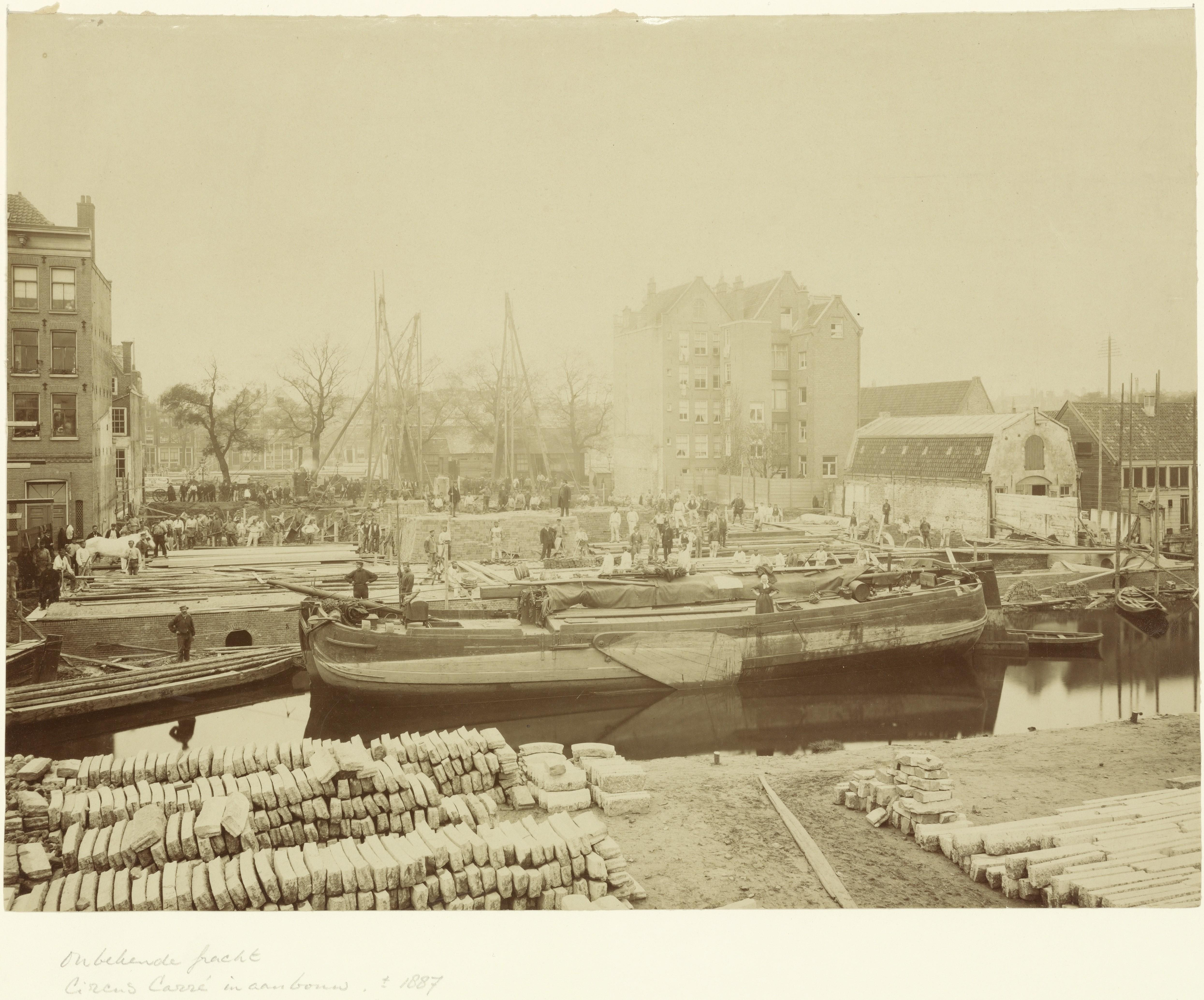
Circus Carré at the start of construction, seen from the Onbekendegracht. c.1887

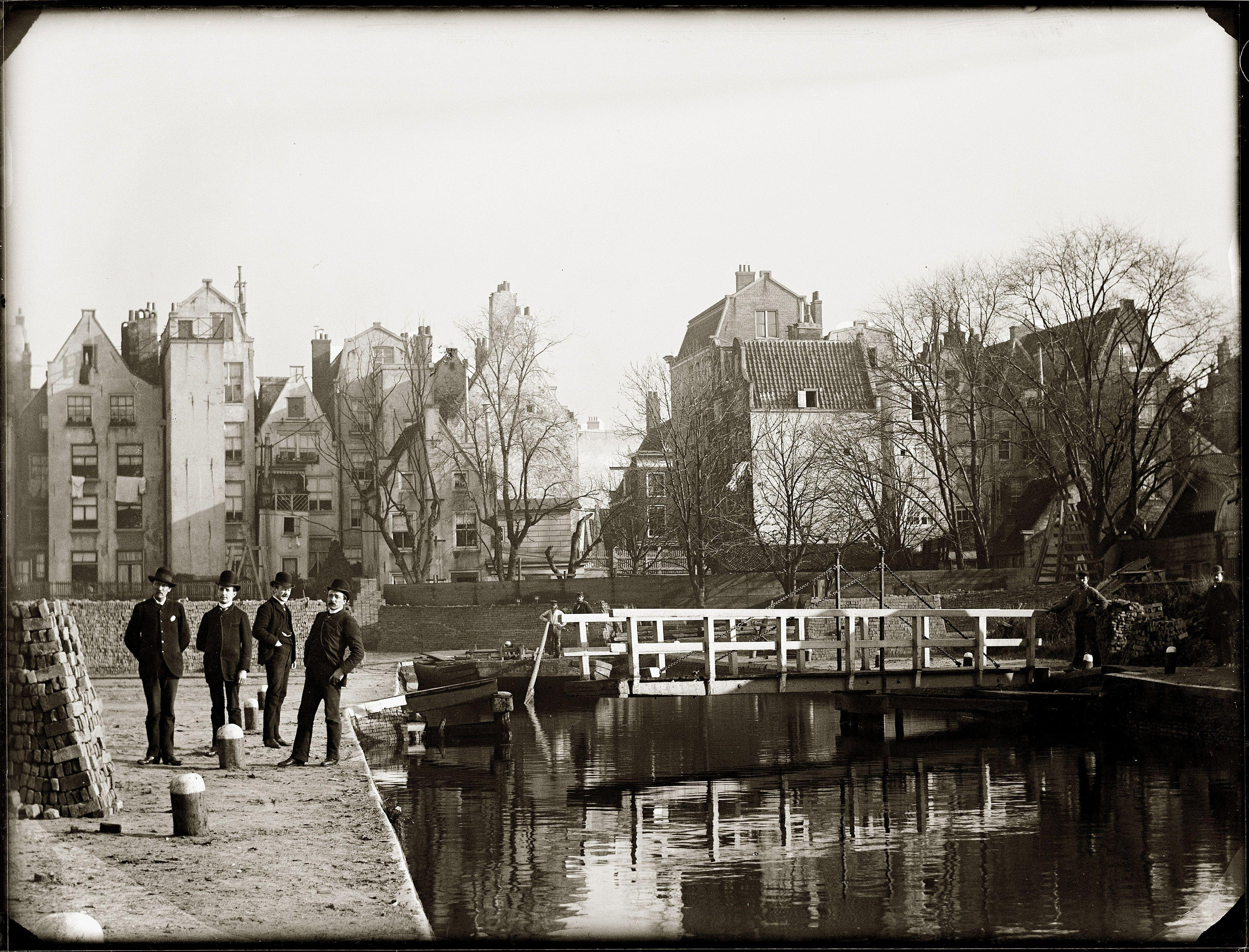
Stratenmakerswerf (now Lepelstraat) Jacob Olie 1891

== See also ==
- Canals of Amsterdam
