= Plantage Muidergracht =

Canal in Amsterdam

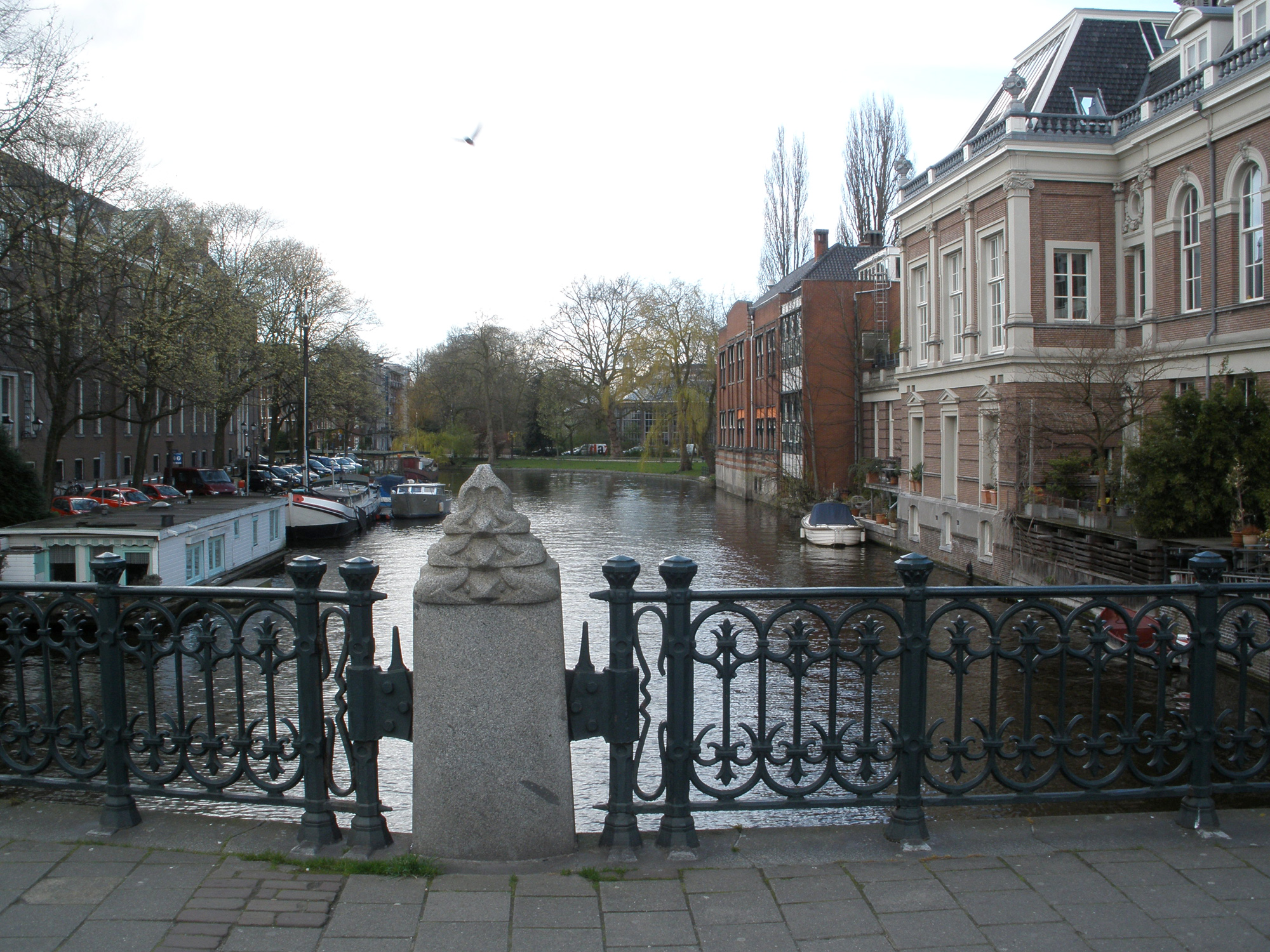
- View from the Lau Mazirel bridge. The street on the left of the canal is Nieuwe Keizersgracht, on the right Plantage Muidergracht

- Location within Amsterdam
- Location: Amsterdam
- Postal code: 1018
- Coordinates: 52.363773°N 4.914974°E
- West end: Nieuwe Keizersgracht
- To: Entrepotdok

The Plantage Muidergracht is a canal and street in the Plantage neighborhood of Amsterdam. On and along the Plantage Muidergracht, near Roeterseiland, are some of the buildings of the University of Amsterdam, originally built for courses or subfaculties of physics, chemistry, biology, environmental science and mathematics, but now used by other faculties.

== Location ==
The Plantage Muidergracht canal forms the southwestern and southeastern boundary of the Plantage. The canal runs in a southeastern direction from the Nieuwe Keizersgracht, at the Hortus Botanicus. Before Sarphatistraat, it turns northeast and runs parallel to the Sarphatistraat along the south of the Artis zoo to the Entrepotdok. The Nieuwe Keizersgracht, Nieuwe Prinsengracht and Nieuwe Achtergracht open into the Plantage Muidergracht. The canal is bridged by Plantage Kerklaan and Plantage Middenlaan.

The Plantage Muidergracht street runs in a southeastern direction from the Plantage Parklaan, parallel to the Plantage Middenlaan. Because the street is partly enclosed by buildings, it does not border on the canal everywhere. Between numbers 33 and 51 there is an alley on the north side that was originally called Montefiorepark. At the end, the street and the canal make a turn in a northeasterly direction to the Plantage Middenlaan.

Part of Plantage Muidergracht borders here on the southeast side of the Artis zoo.

== History ==
The Plantage Muidergracht was originally called the Muidergracht. Part of the Muidergracht was filled in in 1873 and is now the Jonas Daniël Meijerplein and the Hortusplantsoen. Part of the water has remained in the Hortusplantsoen, and this is now called the Hortus Pond. The part of the current Plantage Muidergracht that runs along Sarphatistraat, was an extension of the Lijnbaansgracht and was called the Plantage Lijnbaansgracht before 1915. The Roeterssloot, which culminated in the Plantage Muidergracht, was filled in in 1959.

The Dutch poet and essayist Adriaan Morriën (1912–2002) lived at Plantage Muidergracht 3 and also named part one of his memoirs: Plantage Muidergracht. The Dutch journalist, writer and director Milo Anstadt (1920–2011) lived with his family at Plantage Muidergracht 89. Their house is described in Anstadt's book De verdachte oorboog. The sculptor Theresia van der Pant (19242013) lived and died at number 153.

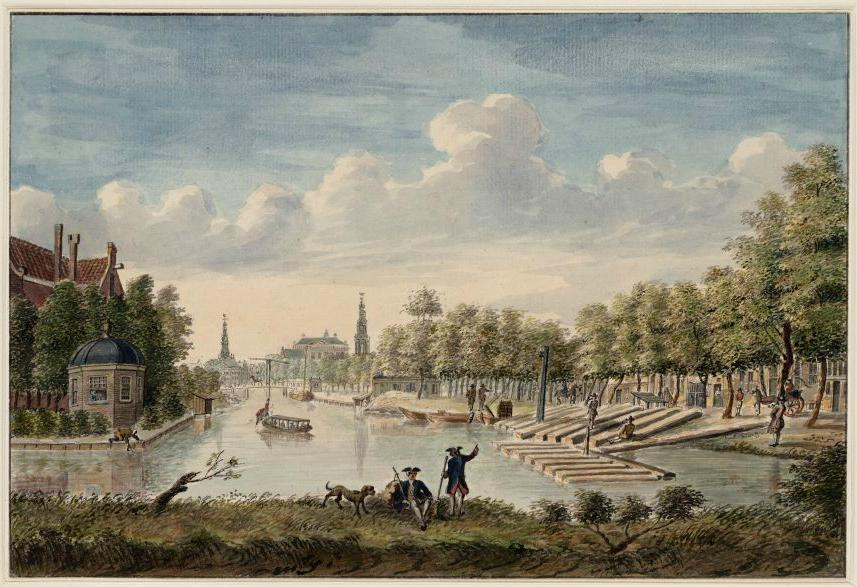
The Plantage Muidergracht, seen from the Schans (now Sarphatistraat) c. 1749.

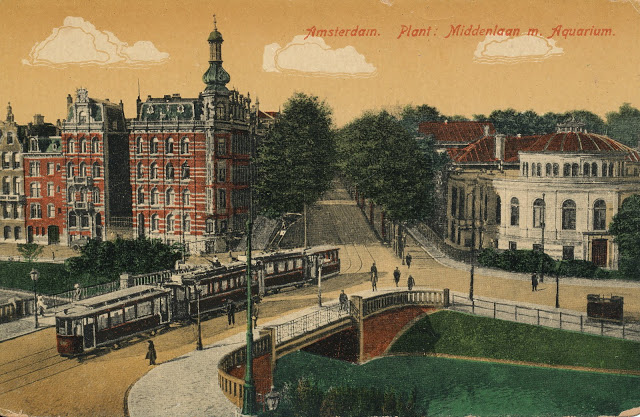
1915 trams crossing Plantage Middenlaan

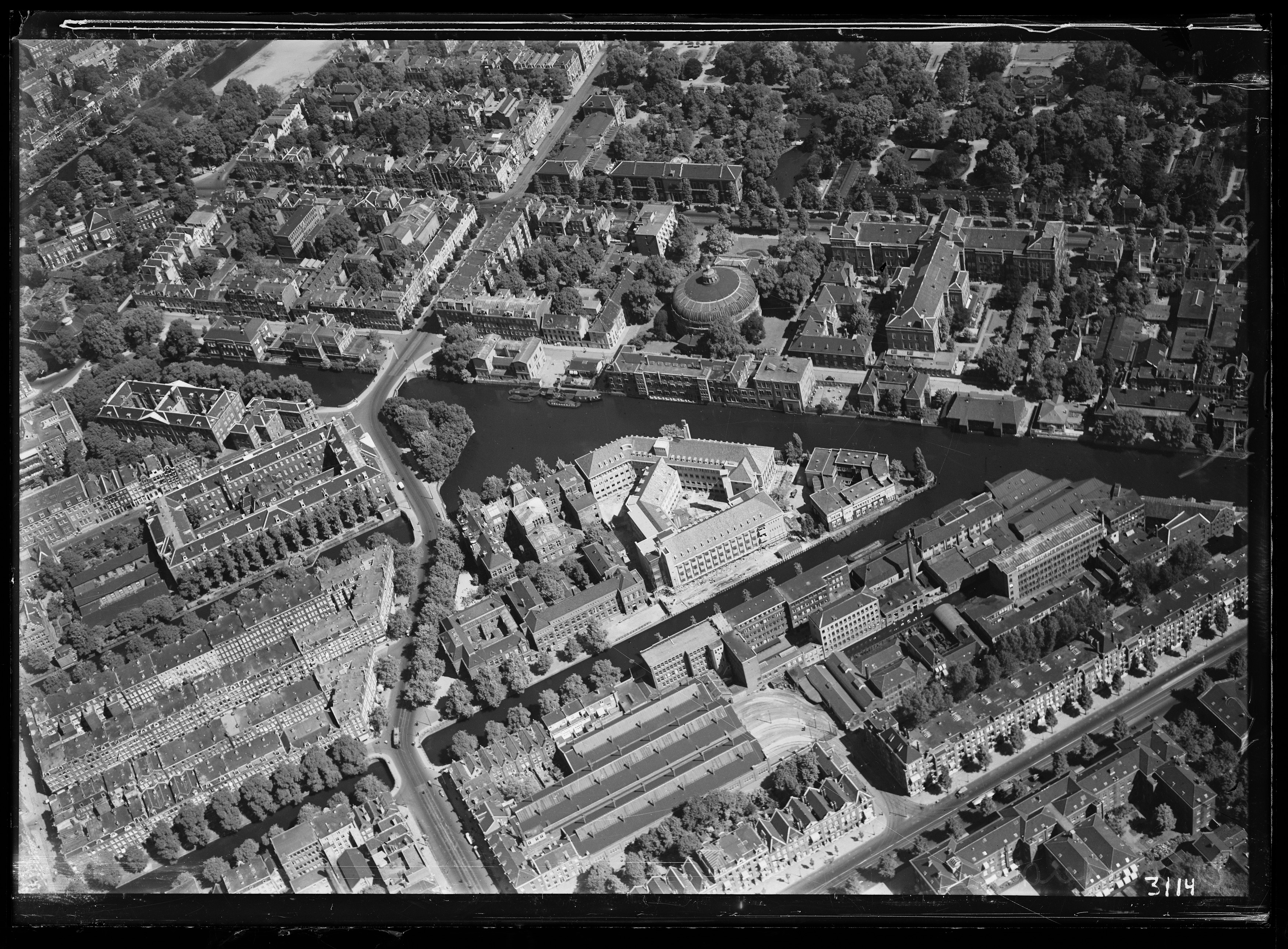
Aerial photo of the Roetersstraat and surroundings, seen in a northerly direction. In the middle under the Roetersstraat. Plantage Muidergracht in the middle from left to right. Behind it the Plantage neighborhood; circa 1930.

== See also ==
- Canals of Amsterdam
