= Nieuwe Keizersgracht =

Canal in Amsterdam

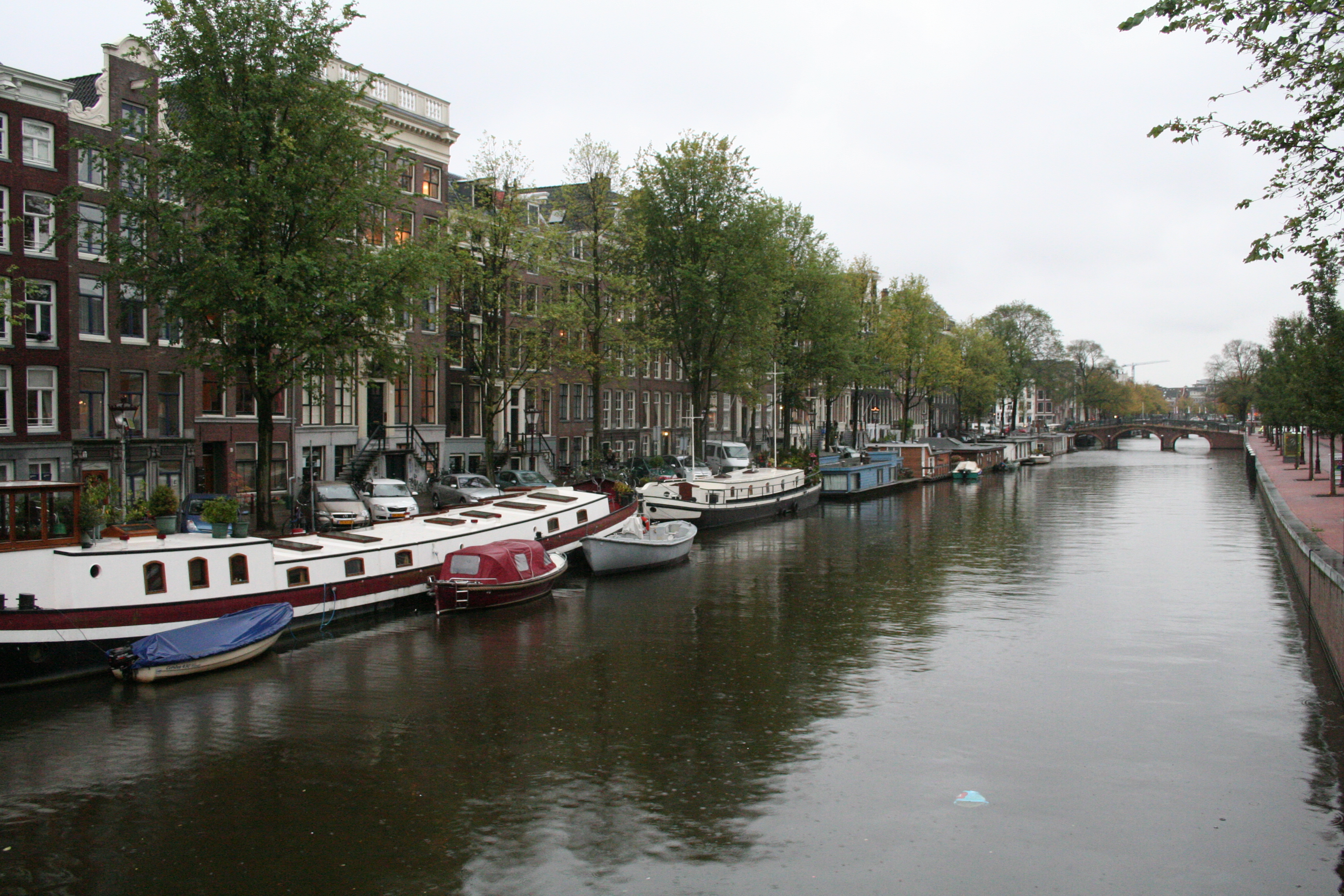
- Nieuwe Keizersgracht October 2009

- Location of the canal (dark blue)
- Location: Amsterdam
- Postal code: 1016
- Coordinates: 52.365°N 4.904722°E
- West end: Amstel
- To: Plantage Muidergracht

The Nieuwe Keizersgracht is a canal in Amsterdam, part of the eastern Grachtengordel (canal belt).

== Location ==
The Nieuwe Keizersgracht is an extension of the Keizersgracht, between the Amstel and Plantage Muidergracht in the Plantage neighborhood of the Amsterdam-Centrum district. There are two bridges over the Nieuwe Keizersgracht: bridge no. 241 (Weesperzijde) and no. 240 (Weesperstraat).

== History ==
The Keizersgracht, the second of the three main canals of the canal belt, was built in 1612. The part between the Amstel and Leidsegracht is part of the explanation of 1658. With the last extension, the part east of the Amstel was dug. This last part, the Nieuwe Keizersgracht (also called the Jewish Keizersgracht ), was located in the prosperous part of the Amsterdam Jewish quarter, as were the Nieuwe Herengracht and the Nieuwe Prinsengracht.

== Monuments and architecture ==
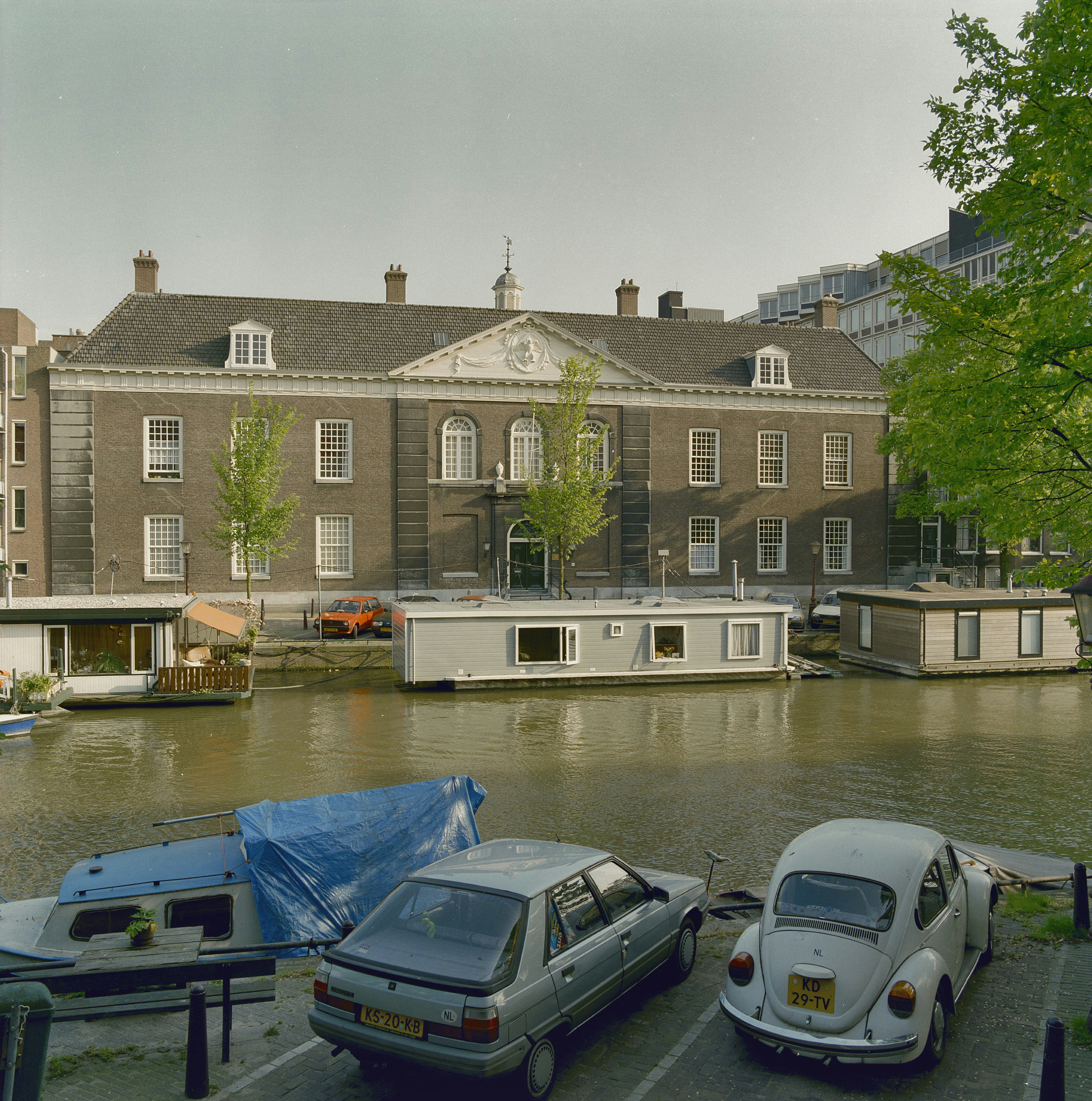
Facade of Occo's Hofje on the Nieuwe Keizersgracht 94 in 1992

- The Amstelhof was built in 1681 between the Nieuwe Keizersgracht and the Nieuwe Herengracht as a home for the elderly in need of care. After a major renovation, the H'ART Museum opened its doors here in 2009 .
- The Van Limmikhof (Nieuwe Keizersgracht 1A) from 1895 is between the side entrance of the Hermitage Amsterdam (Nieuwe Keizersgracht 1) and the Weesperstraat. There is also Het Hodshonhuis, from 1876. The buildings, like the 18th-century houses Het Corvershof and Amstelrank on Nieuwe Herengracht, were commissioned by the Diaconie to accommodate and care for the elderly and the sick. The houses are part of the Amstelhoven complex, which used to include the building that now houses the Hermitage Amsterdam. They still house organizations related to De Protestante Diaconie Amsterdam and share the "Mien Ruys" courtyard garden adjacent to the museum.
- In 1772 the Wittenberg, an Evangelical - Lutheran Parish House for old men and women, was opened on Roetersstraat between Nieuwe Keizersgracht and Nieuwe Kerkstraat. The Amsterdam city council provided a parcel "freely" along the Muidergracht (now Nieuwe Keizersgracht) and did not ask for taxes. This gesture was accepted with great thanks and because of this generosity, the building could also become larger than originally intended.
- The imposing Van Brants-Rushofje at Nieuwe Keizersgracht 28-44 was built in 1733 by order of Christoffel Brants to a design by Daniel Marot to accommodate childless older women. The board consisted of regents appointed by Lutheran elders. The beautiful façade of the Style Louis XIV double-paved house looks like a patrician canal house and shows a symbolic relief that symbolizes kindness. Below that is the noble weapon of Brants. Above the door is the name of the courtyard with a poem.
- Hofje van Merchtheid, Nieuwe Keizersgracht 94, better known as Occo's hofje, was built in 1774 for Roman Catholic care for the elderly. The handrails of the special sidewalk are designed in rococo style and end in an eagle's head.

== Famous residents ==
- Abraham Henriquez de Ferrera, major shareholder of the Dutch East India Company (VOC) .
- Isaac de Pinto (1717–87), philosopher during the Age of Enlightenment and, among other things, governor at the VOC. He lived for a long time on the Nieuwe Keizersgracht with Abraham Henriquez de Ferrera, a major shareholder of the VOC.

== Miscellaneous ==
- The restaurant of the Hermitage Amsterdam "Neva" museum is freely accessible via the Nieuwe Keizersgracht 1 entrance.
- Stichting Landelijk Homojongeren Overleg (LHJO), was located in a basement on the Nieuwe Keizersgracht. In 1991, they temporarily took over the edition of the Expreszo magazine, which made national publication and individual sales possible.
- The Jewish Council resided on Nieuwe Keizersgracht 58 during the Second World War, until the dismantling and deportation of employees in September 1943.
- At number 24 a plaque was placed on 13 December 2009 in memory of the Jewish family Kok, who were deported from this building during World War II and later killed in Auschwitz and Mauthausen.
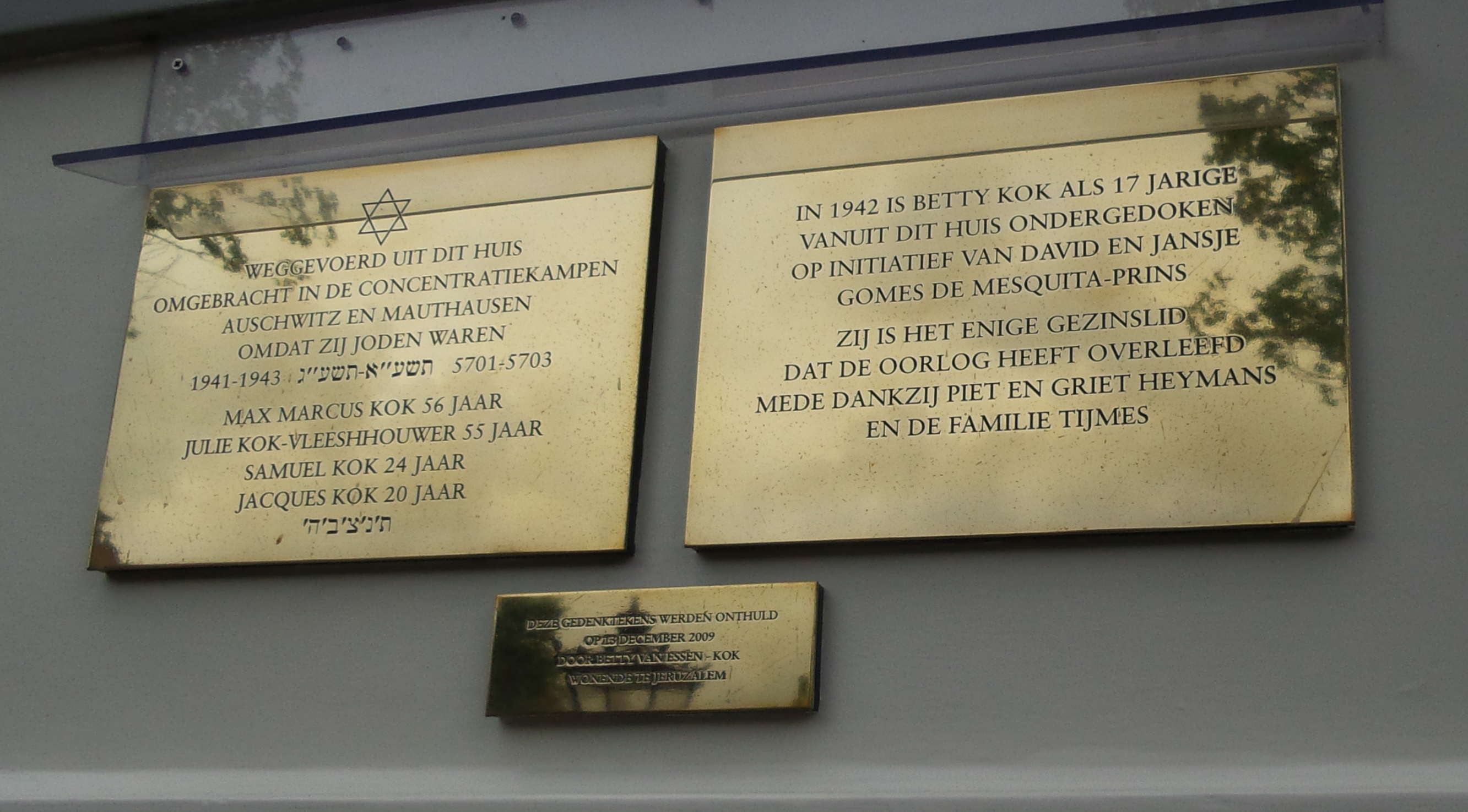
War memorial

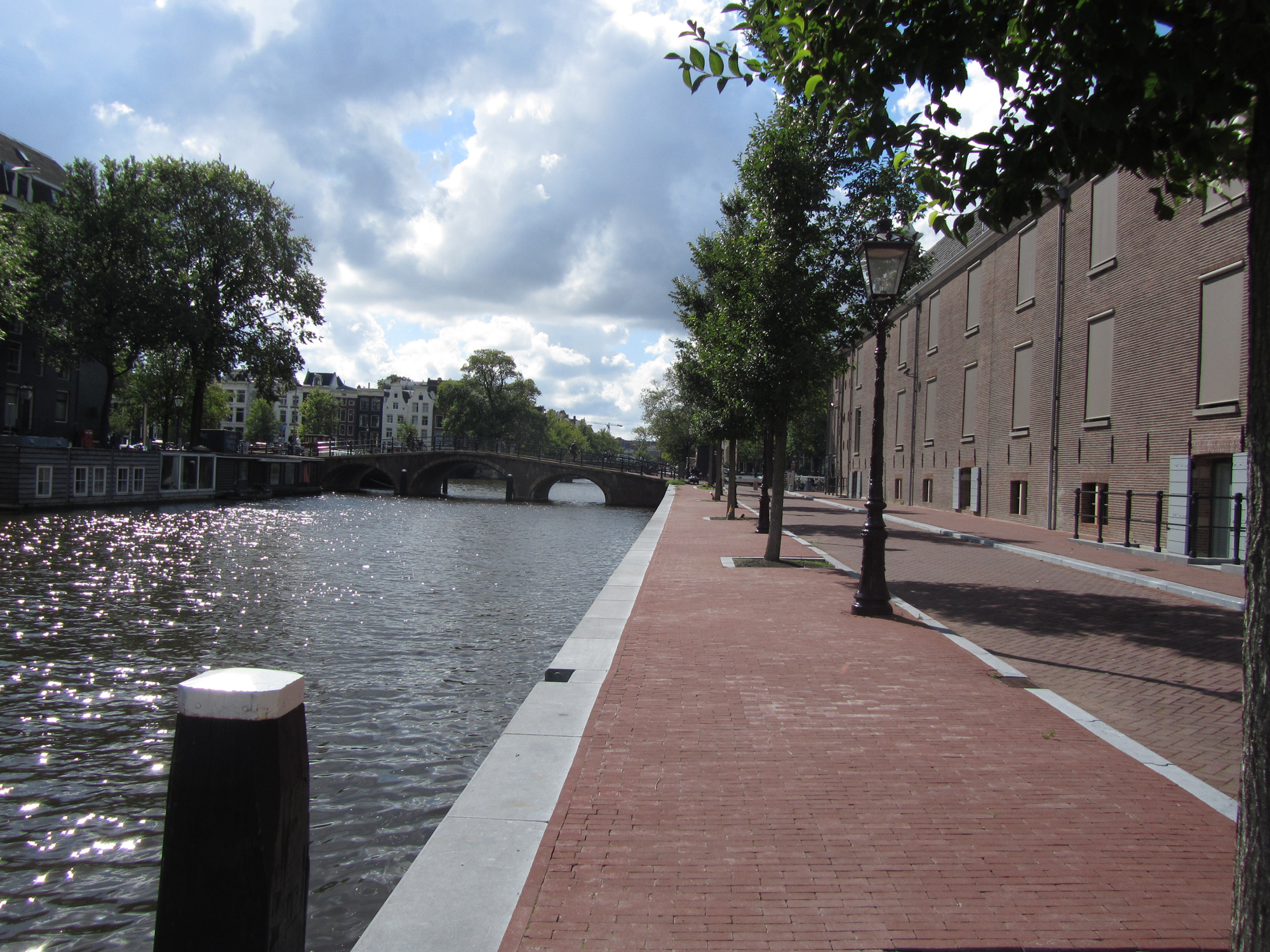
Nieuwe Keizersgracht (north side), looking towards the Amstel. Right: the Hermitage.

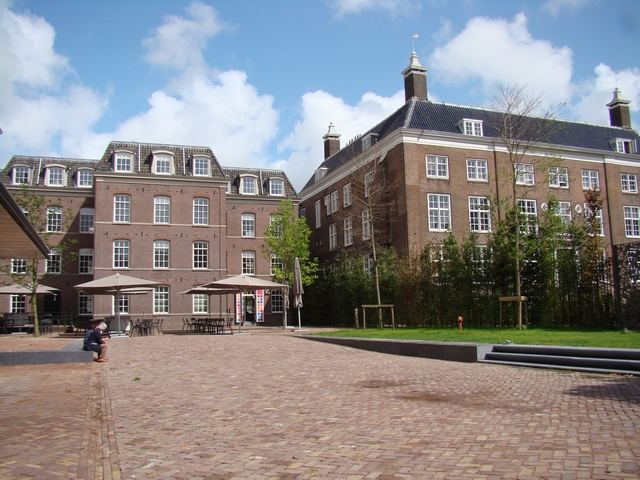
View from Nieuwe Keizersgracht 1; the Hermitage side entrance. On the right the rear of the Corvershof.

== See also ==
- Canals of Amsterdam
