= Nieuwe Prinsengracht =

Canal in Amsterdam

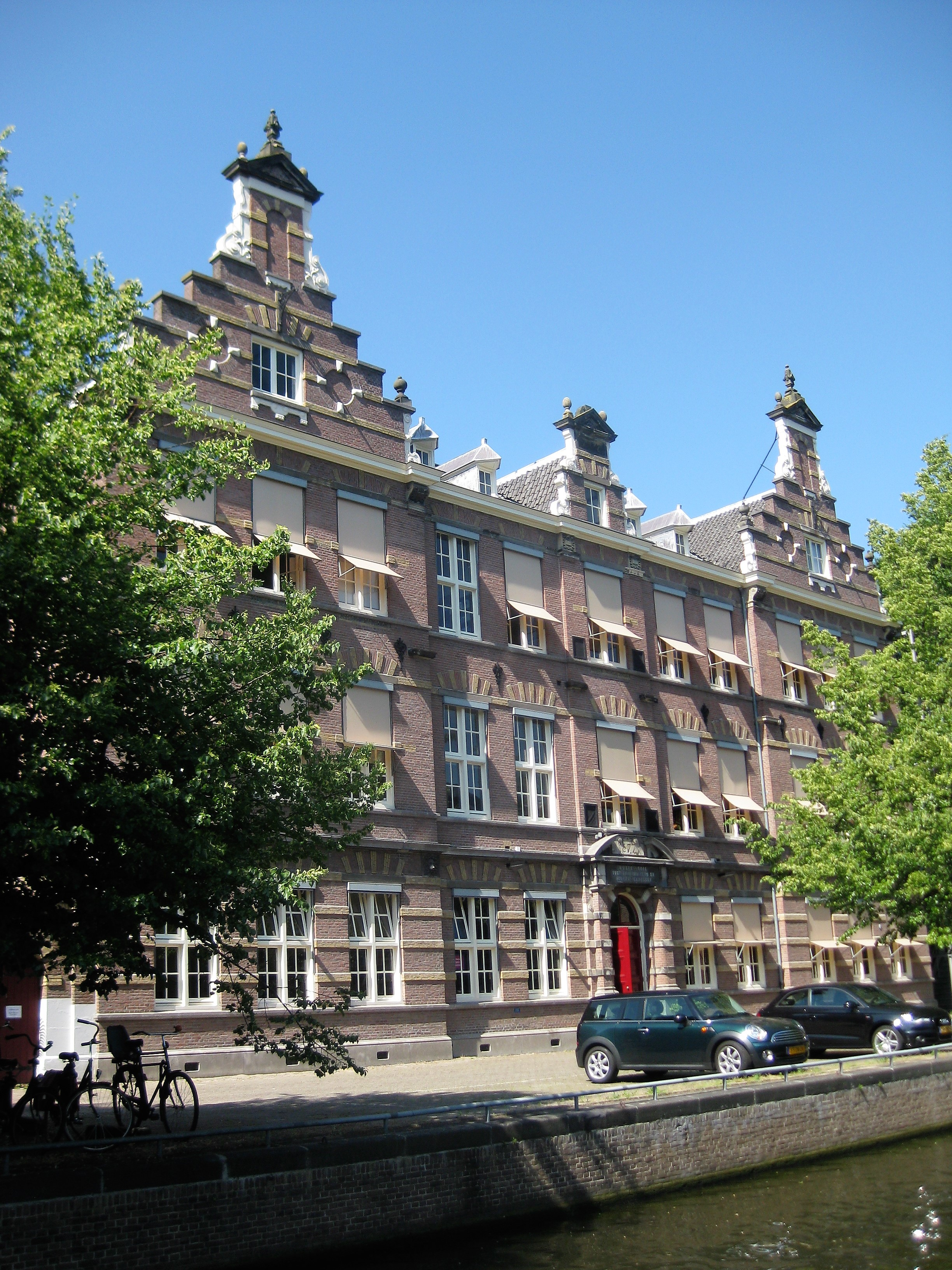
- Nieuwe Prinsengracht 89

- Location of the canal (dark blue) in Plantage
- Length: 0.6 kilometres (0.37 mi)
- Location: Amsterdam
- Postal code: 1018
- Coordinates: 52.363667°N 4.907413°E
- West end: Amstel
- To: Plantage Muidergracht

The Nieuwe Prinsengracht is a canal in the Plantage neighborhood of Amsterdam, an extension of the Prinsengracht in the eastern Grachtengordel (canal belt).

== Location ==
The Nieuwe Prinsengracht runs between the Amstel and the Plantage Muidergracht. It is connected to Onbekendegracht, which runs behind the Royal Theater Carré, and is crossed by Weesperstraat and Roetersstraat. There are three bridges over the Nieuwe Prinsengracht: bridge no. 250 (Weesperzijde) on the Amstel, bridge no. 251 (Weesperstraat) and bridge no. 258 (Roetersstraat).

== Architecture ==
- Due to their special architecture, the Nieuwe Prinsengracht 86-94 buildings are on the municipal monument list .
- The Ben Polakbrug (bridge no. 258, a so-called plate bridge from 1924) spans the Nieuwe Prinsengracht at the Roetersstraat. The bridge is named after alderman, doctor and resistance fighter Ben Polak (1913–93).
- The building of the former Geological Institute, built in 1930 at Nieuwe Prinsengracht 130, is on the municipal monument list.

== History ==
The Prinsengracht, the third of the three main canals in the Amsterdam canal belt, was built in 1612. The part between the Leidsegracht and the Amstel belongs to the expansion of 1658. The part to the east of the Amstel was constructed with the last extension. This last part, the Nieuwe Prinsengracht, also called the Joodse Prinsengracht, was located in the prosperous part of Amsterdam's Jewish quarter, as were the Nieuwe Herengracht and the Nieuwe Keizersgracht.

Until 1866 the Nieuwe Prinsengracht ran east of the Muidergracht to the Entrepotdok. The three ponds within the Artis zoo site still remain from the filled-in section of the canal.

== Famous residents ==
- Joop Admiraal, (1937–2006), actor
- Joseph Mendes da Costa, (1863–1939), sculptor
- Samuel Jessurun de Mesquita, (1868–1944), graphic artist
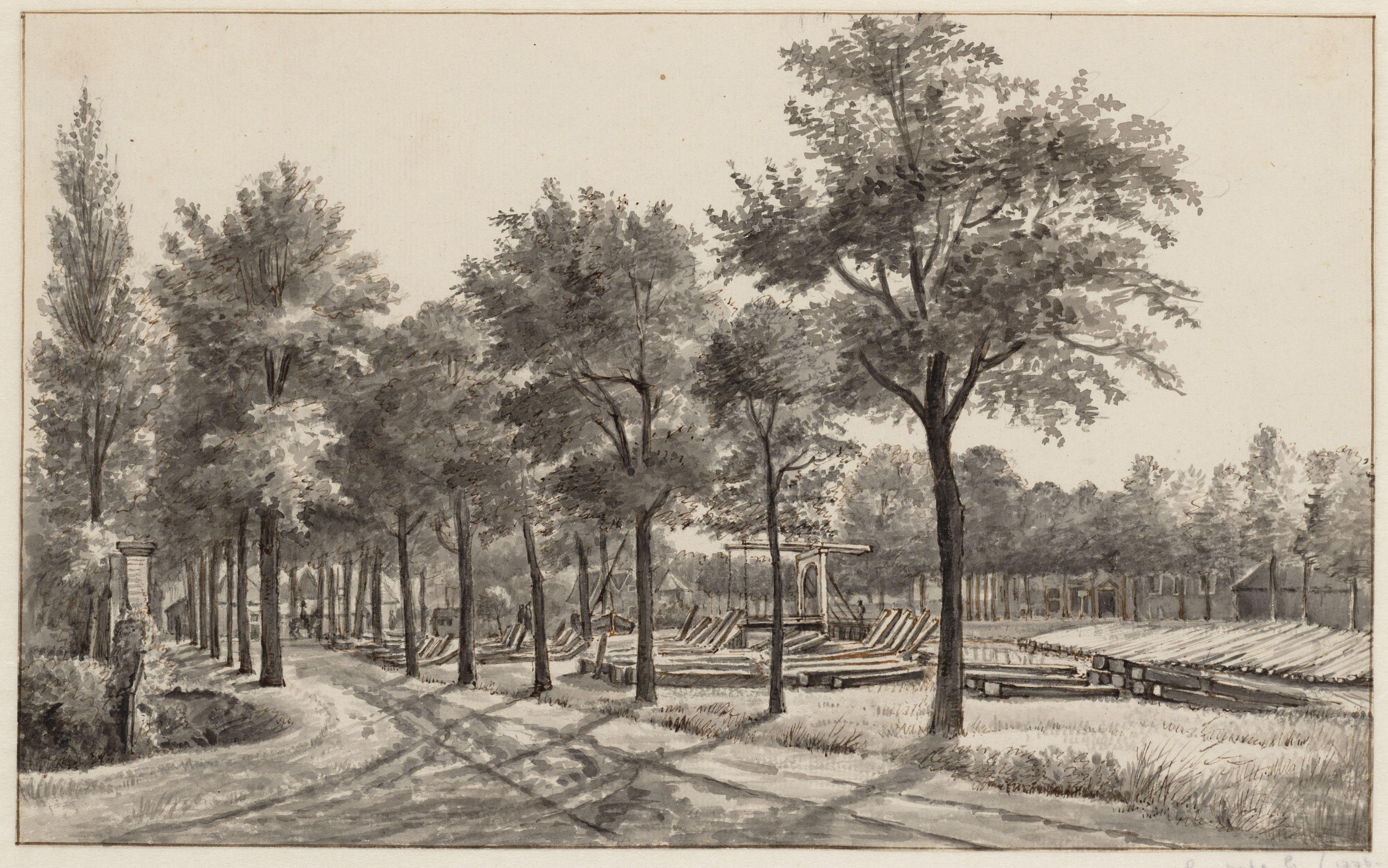
Plantage from dome in Ouderhoek garden.Right: Nieuwe Prinsengracht & bridge at Muiderstraat, now Plantage Middenlaan. Gerrit Lamberts (1817)

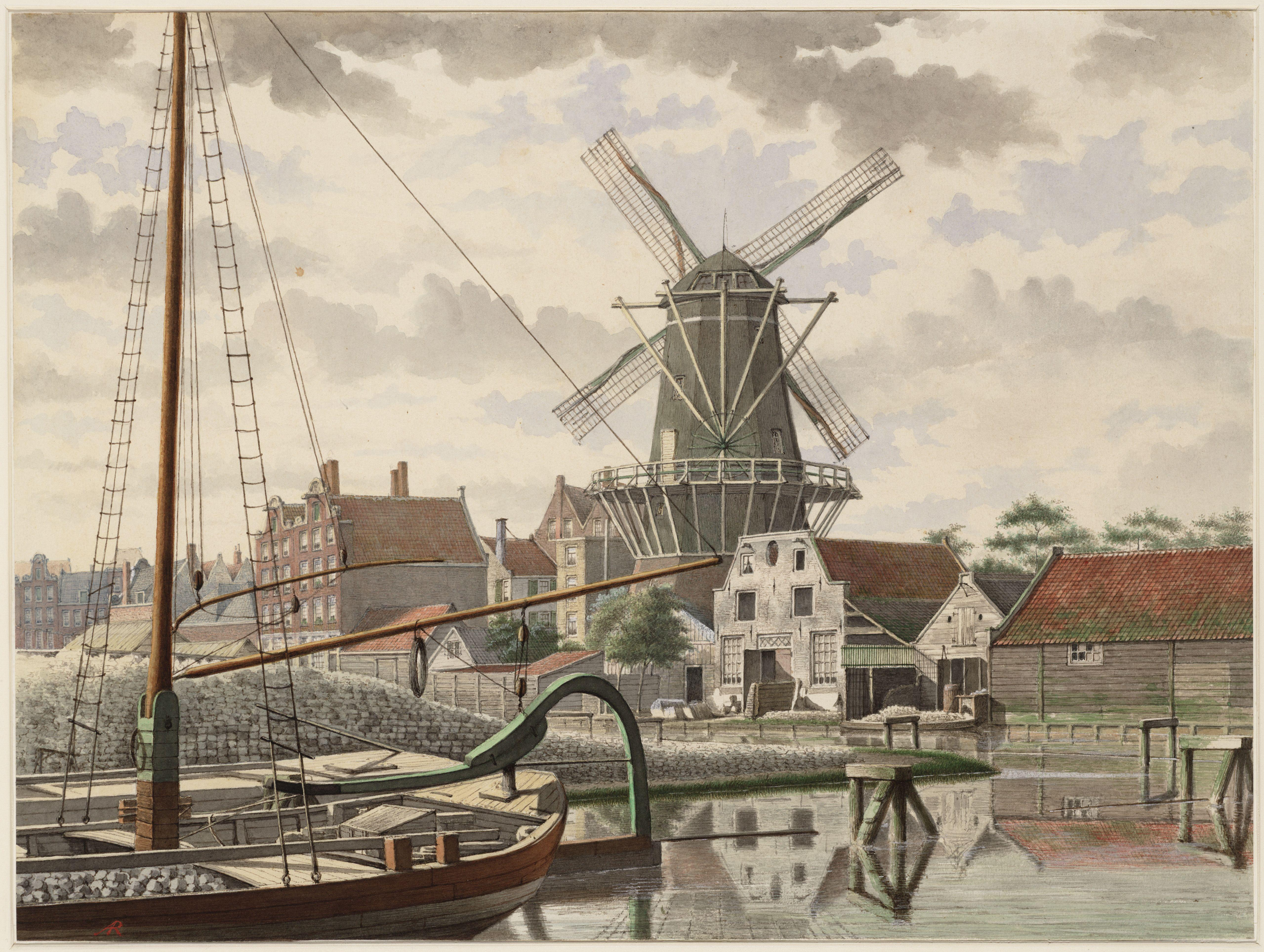
Nieuwe Prinsengracht from Onbekendegracht with "De Eendracht" mill (demolished 1876). J.M.A. Rieke

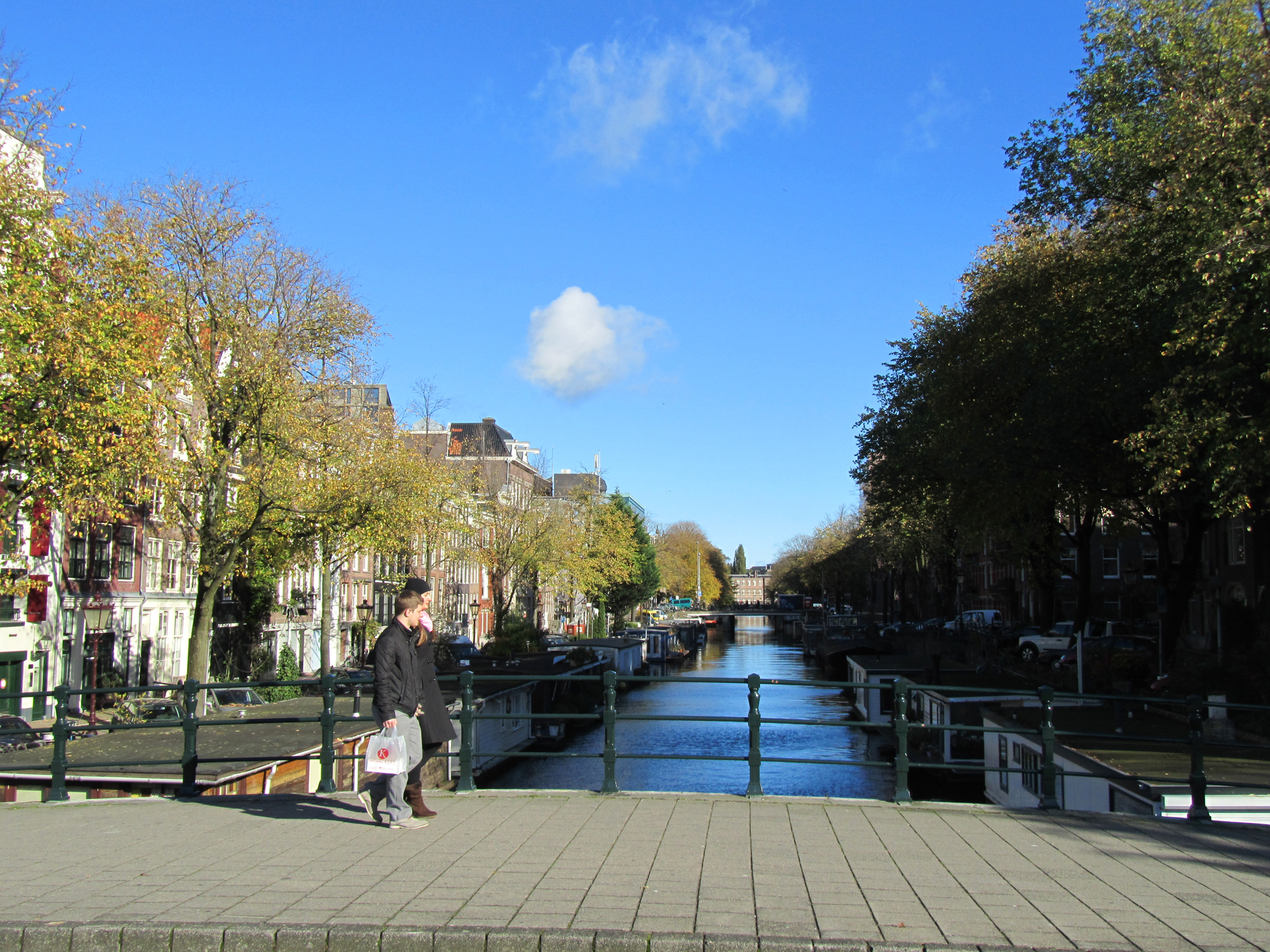
Nieuwe Prinsengracht in an easterly direction, seen from the bridge at the Amstel

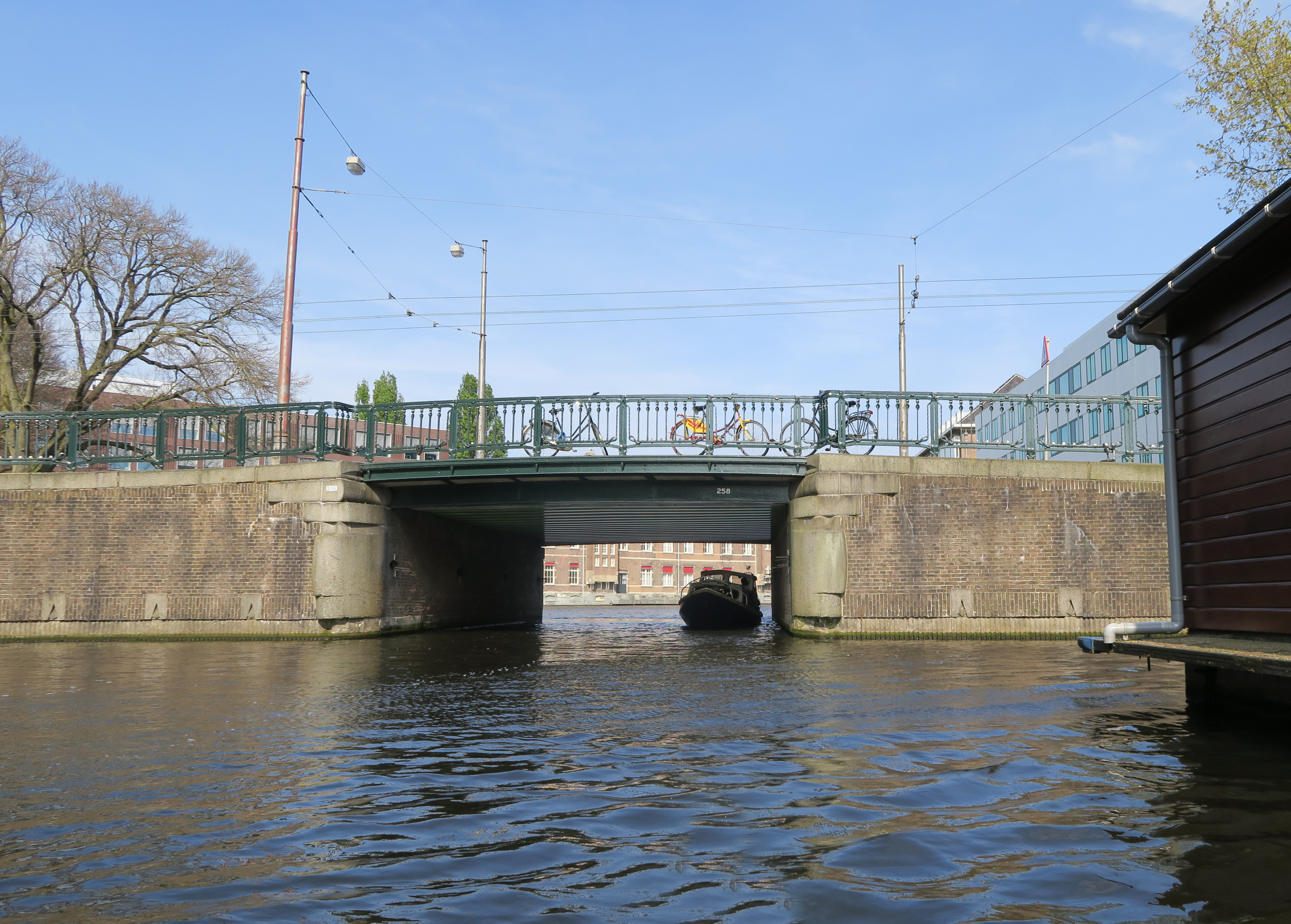
Ben Polakbrug (bridge 258)

== See also ==
- Canals of Amsterdam
