= Grachtengordel =

Canal District Grachtengordel
- World Heritage Site
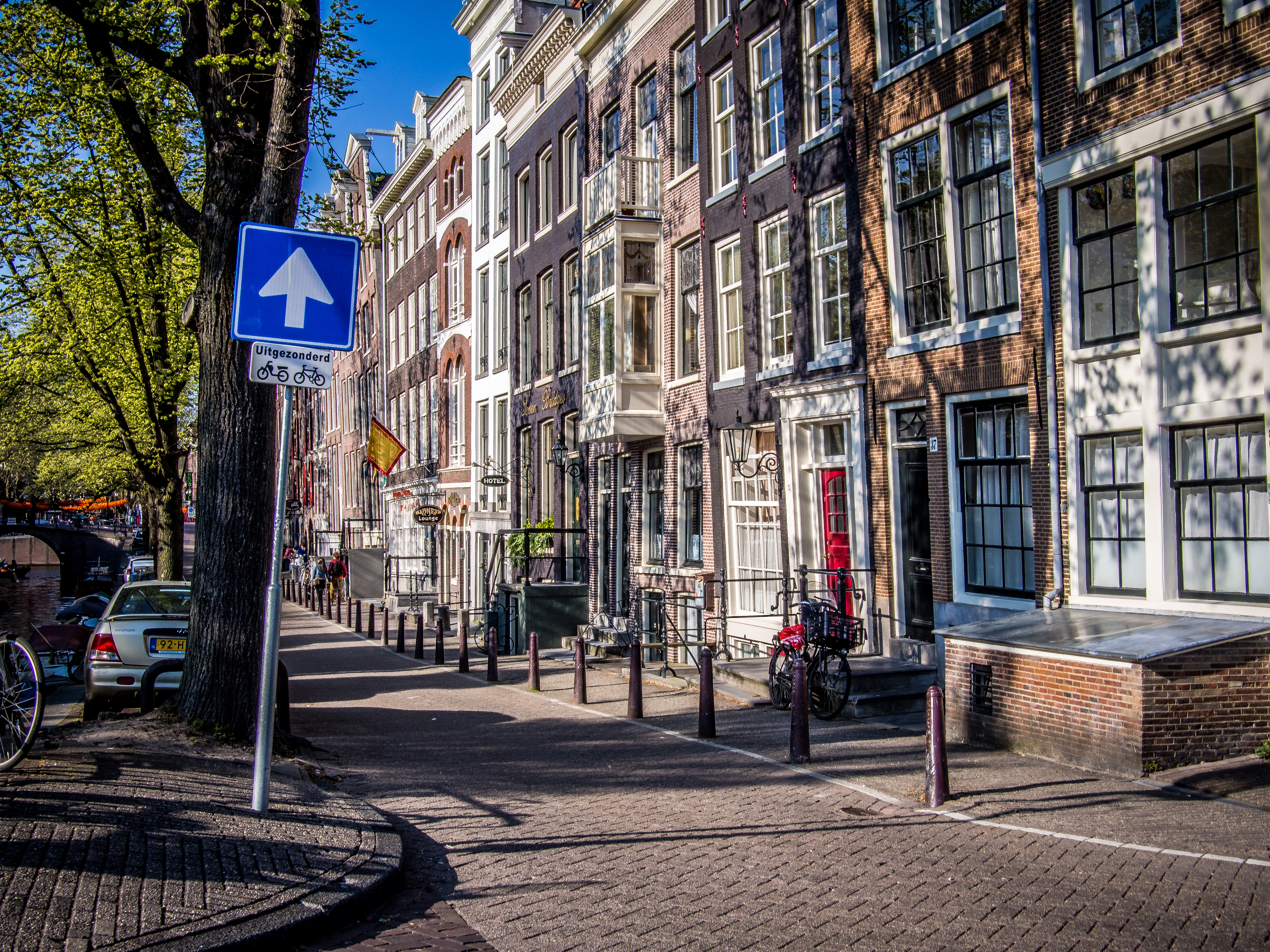
- Reguliersgracht, Amsterdam-Centrum

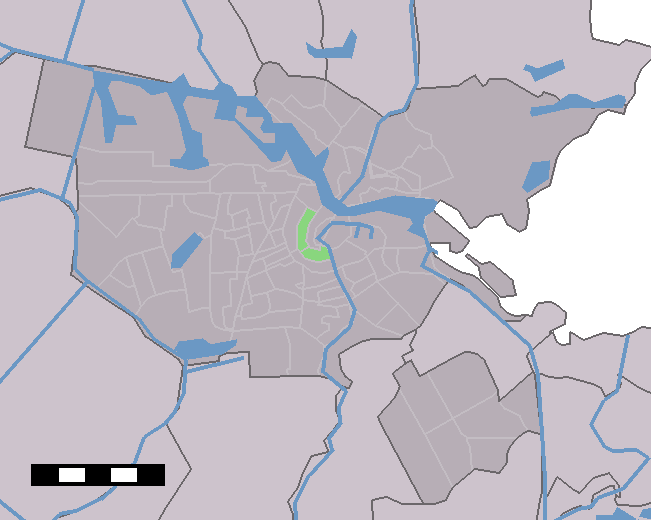
- Location of the Grachtengordel (green) in Amsterdam
- Country: Netherlands
- Province: North Holland
- Municipality: Amsterdam
- Borough: Centrum
- Time zone: UTC+1 (CET)

UNESCO World Heritage Site
- Official name: Seventeenth-Century Canal Ring Area of Amsterdam inside the Singelgracht
- Criteria: Cultural: (i), (ii), (iv)
- Reference: 1349
- Inscription: 2010 (34th Session)
- Area: 198.2 ha (490 acres)
- Buffer zone: 481.7 ha (1,190 acres)

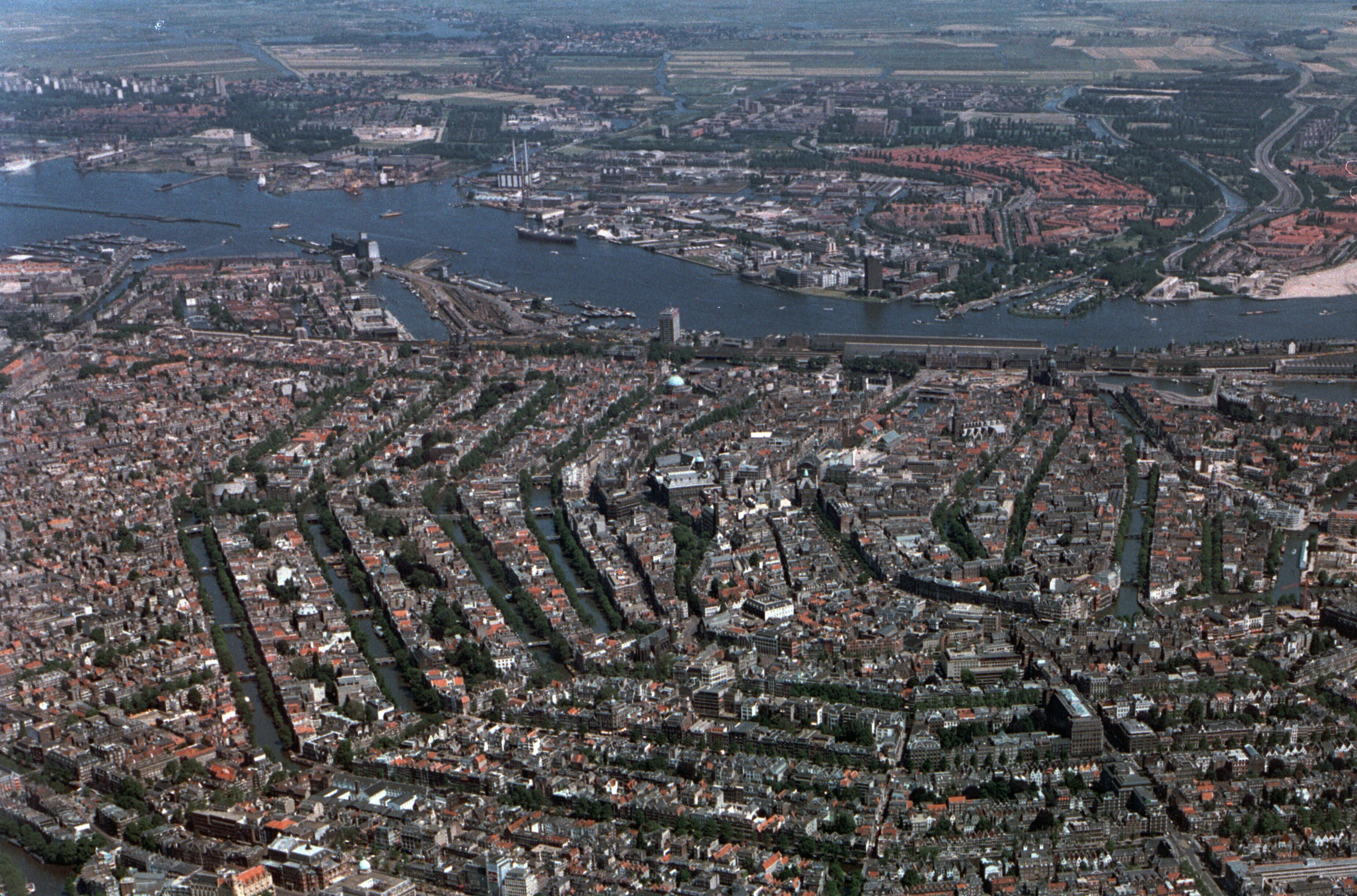
Overview of the Amsterdam Grachtengordel with the river IJ near the top.

The Grachtengordel (Dutch pronunciation: [ˌɣrɑxtə(ŋ)ˈɣɔrdəl], lit. 'canal belt/girdle'), known in English as the Canal District, is a neighborhood in Amsterdam, Netherlands located in the Centrum district. The seventeenth-century canals of Amsterdam, located in the center of Amsterdam, were added to the UNESCO World Heritage List in August 2010. The Amsterdam Canal District consists of the area around the city's four main canals: the Singel, the Herengracht, the Keizersgracht, and the Prinsengracht. From the Brouwersgracht, the canals are generally parallel with one another, leading gradually southeast into the Amstel river.

Many of the canal houses in the Amsterdam Canal District are from the Dutch Golden Age, 17th century. Many of these buildings, however, underwent restoration or reconstruction in various centuries, meaning that the buildings display many different architectural styles and facades.

== History ==
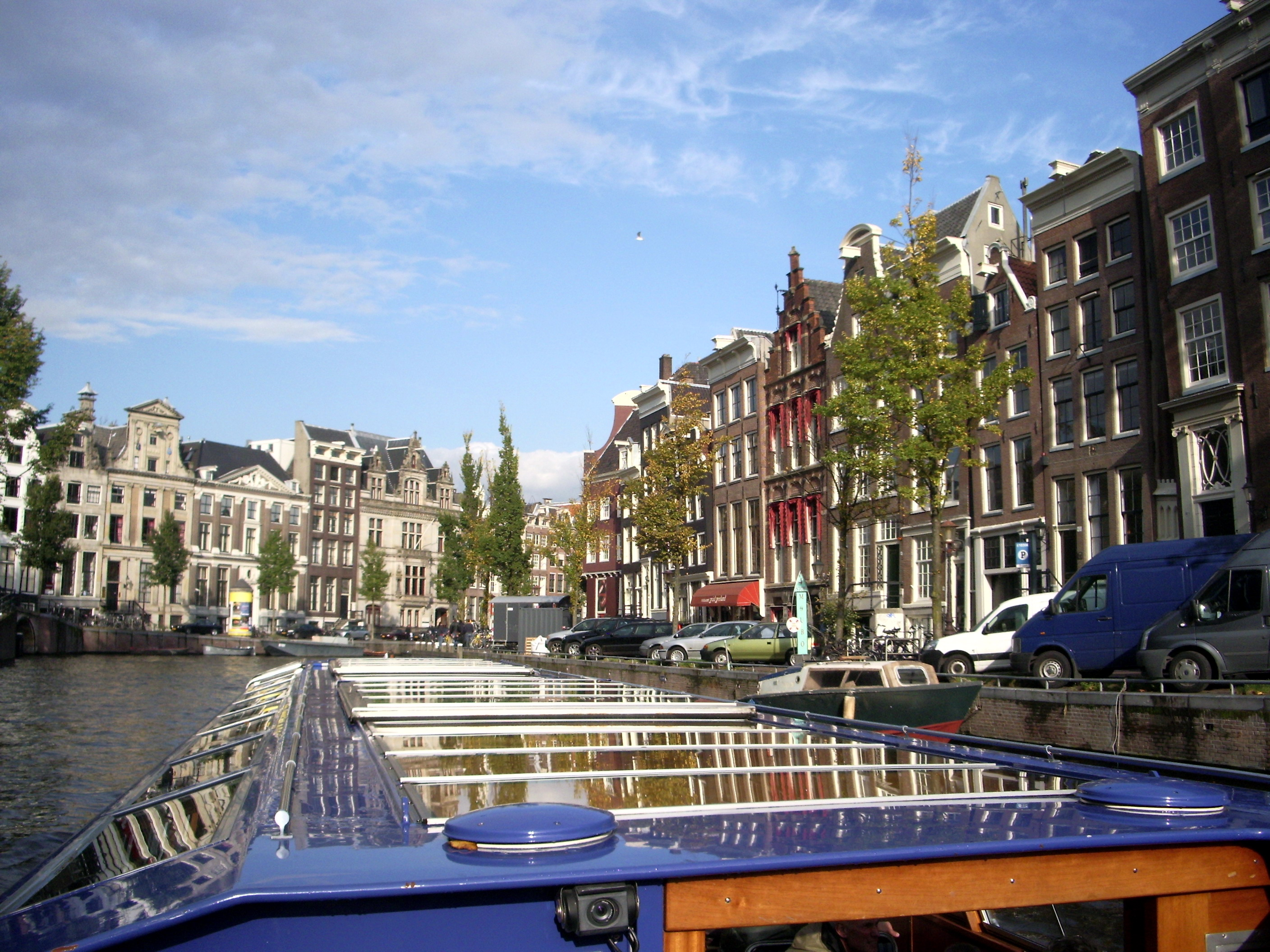
View of the Herengracht

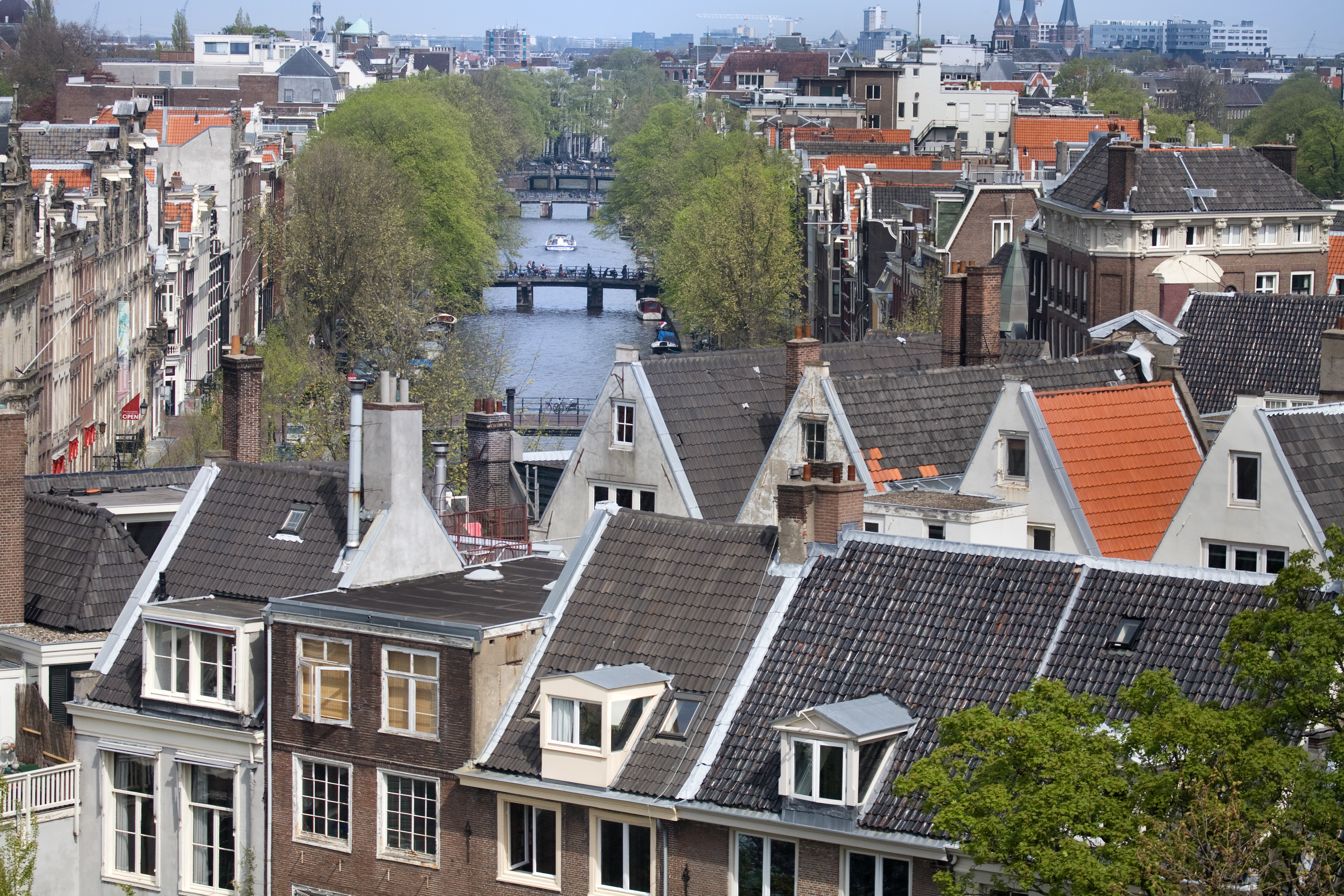
Keizersgracht, 2008

Until the end of the 16th century, the city of Amsterdam encompassed the area inside the Singel and what is now Kloveniersburgwal. After the Alteration and change in management, the city expanded explosively. This led to Amsterdam's expansion in four stages between 1585 and 1665. In 1613, during the Twelve Years' Truce, reclamation of Herengracht, Keizersgracht, and Prinsengracht began.

After the Peace of Westphalia, Amsterdam created new space for investment and new plans were developed to expand the city. From about 1660, the canals were extended to the Amstel; these extensions bear the names: Nieuwe Herengracht, Nieuwe Keizersgracht and Nieuwe Prinsengracht. With this expansion, the city formed its iconic crescent shape.

== World Heritage ==
In July 2006, the city of Amsterdam announced its intention to nominate the canal ring as a UNESCO World Heritage Site. Because of new administrative requirements for the nomination, however, the nomination was delayed until December 2008. On August 1, 2010, at the 34th session of the World Heritage Committee the Grachtengordel was added to the World Heritage List.

Amsterdam's canal belt has been named a World Heritage Site under the criteria I, II, and IV; “to represent a masterpiece of human creative genius;” “to exhibit an important interchange of human values, over a span of time or within a cultural area of the world, on developments in architecture or technology, monumental arts, town-planning or landscape design;” and “to be an outstanding example of a type of building, architectural or technological ensemble or landscape which illustrates (a) significant stage(s) in human history,” respectively.

In 2013, Amsterdam celebrated the 400th birthday of the Canal Ring.

== Museums and tourist attractions ==
The area is known for its small bridges going over the canals and 17th-century canal homes. The Anne Frank House is located in the Grachtengordel neighborhood on Prinsengracht.

Other museums in the area include Het Grachtenhuis, Museum Van Loon, Museum of Bags and Purses, Museum Willet-Holthuysen, Museum Ons' Lieve Heer op Solder, Bijbels Museum, Foam Fotografiemuseum Amsterdam, Pijpenkabinet & Smokiana, Huis Marseille, and Museum Geelvinck-Hinlopen.
