= De Roos =

Mill in Delft, South Holland, Netherlands

De Roos Mill
- De Roos (The Rose), De Roosmolen, Koren op de Molen
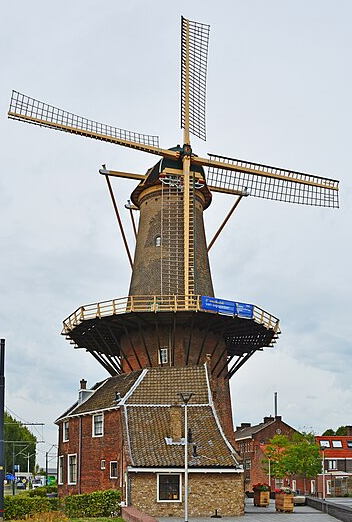
- The De Roos mill, its miller's house and warehouse on Phoenixstraat, Delft in 2022.
- Interactive map of De Roos Mill
- Location: Phoenixstraat 111-112, Delft, South Holland, Netherlands
- Builder: Floris van Mierop
- Type: Windmill, domestic building
- Material: Wood, brick, metal, stone
- Width: 25.35 m (total diameter of the wheel formed by the sails); Mass: 1,100 tonnes
- Height: 32 m (12 m from gallery to calotte)
- Beginning date: 17th century, 1679 (reconstruction), 1728 (second phase of construction), around 1760 (third phase of construction and final general appearance)
- Dedicated date: Grain mill, gristmill
- Restored date: 1929, 1930, 1942, 1960s, 1980s, 2000-2010, 2023
- Website: molenderoos.nl
- Heritage: Mill: Monument national (12159) (June 29, 1967); Miller's house and warehouse: Monument national (12158) (June 29, 1967)

De Roos (literally, "The Rose"), also locally known as Roosmolen or Koren op de Molen, is a wind and platform mill situated within the municipality of Delft, in the South Holland province of the Netherlands.

The mill was originally constructed on the southern city wall of Delft but was later relocated and rebuilt above the western fortifications of the Dutch municipality in 1679. Two principal phases of implementation of the Delft mill followed this reconstruction. The first was dated 1728, while the second was from the 1760s. The building has been the subject of multiple restoration projects, commencing in the late 1920s and concluding in 2023. The artistic work, whose historical background remains largely uncharted before its 1679 reconstruction, represents the sole surviving mill within the erstwhile fortified zone of Delft, among the eighteen that previously operated within the Dutch city.

On the current site of De Roos, at 111-112 Phoenixstraat, there originally stood a post mill called Gasthuismolen, which was destroyed during a storm in the second half of the 17th century. Previously bordered by the tramway and then the railway line connecting the city to The Hague, the site of De Roos mill has been situated above the Willem of Orange railway tunnel since the second half of the 2010s. The construction of this infrastructure necessitated the hydraulic jacking and the underpinning of the De Roos complex — mill, miller's house, warehouse — and preventive archaeological excavations that revealed remnants of the windmill dating from the late 17th century and early 18th century, as well as elements of the western portion of the medieval city wall of Delft.

Despite periods of inactivity, particularly during periods of restoration and repair, the mill remains operational. It has been managed by many millers, including those from the Kouwenhoven, van Rhijn, and De Vreede families.

On June 29, 1967, the Dutch Cultural Heritage Agency designated the De Roos grain mill, along with the miller's house and warehouse surrounding its skirt, as a national monument. The windmill is conical in shape and of the skirt and platform type. It is rather massive in scope and height, constructed of bricks and jointed stones. The mill is equipped with a rotating cap, and the milling work, which transforms grains of cereals into flour, is powered by a complex set of elements, mostly mechanical, motorized, and electric for a few. The house and warehouse, also constructed of masonry bricks, feature facades with gables.

== Location and situation ==
The Roos mill (19) on the map of Delft's historic town center. The old town wall is represented by the grey line.

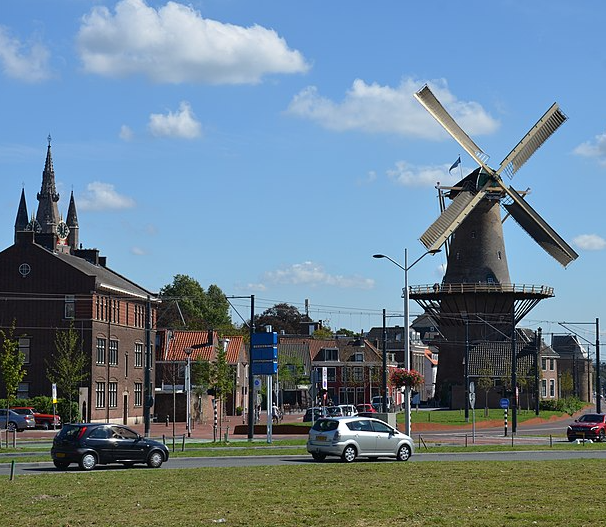
The mill on Phoenixstraat, the spires of the Oude Kerk on the left, the Bagijnetoren on the right.

De Roos is situated in the western portion of the historic center of Delft, a municipality in the province of South Holland. The mill is situated at 112 Phoenixstraat. (Note: Phoenixstraat gets its name from Phoenix, a Delft student organization headquartered on this street. At one time, it was proposed that this urban street be named after the mill.) The entire De Roos complex, comprising the house and warehouse, is located at 112 and 111 Phoenixstraat, midway along this urban thoroughfare. The Delft Wind Building is situated to the south of Dirklangenstraat and to the north of Dirklangendwarsstraat, which together form an intersection with Phoenixstraat. Additionally, situated along this same urban axis are an ancient fortification tower (the Bagijnetoren) and one of the buildings of the Delft municipal house, which serves as the headquarters of the Delfland Water Board. Phoenixstraat is bordered by Wateringsevest, a former canal dug parallel to the Delft city wall and now filled in. For urban architecture researchers C. Steffen and D.J.M. van der Voordt, the presence of the mill, which they describe as a "pleasant" and "landmark" structure situated in the heart of Delft's town center, imbues the Dutch city with a distinctive charm.

On Phoenixstraat, situated between Dirklangendwarsstraat and Bagijnestraat, another mill, designated for oil production and known as the "Steckmolen" or "molen De Otter," was in operation until 1918. The De Otter mill was situated at a distance of 20 meters from De Roos.

The last remaining windmill in Delft, previously situated atop a bastion platform, is currently located above the Willem van Oranje tunnel on the railway line connecting the city to The Hague.

The mill, like six other buildings protected as national monuments in the municipality of Delft—namely, the Maria van Jesse church, the water tower, the fortification tower, the Prinsenhof, the Walloon church, and the Oude Kerk—is situated in an isopleth of altitude at an elevation of 6 meters below sea level. Furthermore, the Delft Windmill is constructed on a subsoil formed during the Pleistocene Epoch. This substrate is predominantly clayey in composition, with lesser proportions of sand and peat.

== History ==
=== From the Late Middle Ages to the end of the Modern Era ===
==== The Gasthuismolen, the first windmill built on the site of 111-112 Phoenixstraat ====
The earliest known reference to a windmill on the site of 111-112 Phoenixstraat is from 1352. This mill was subsequently known as Gasthuismolen (or Bordeelmolen).

The existence of this late medieval mill is substantiated by a fiscal act promulgated by the then Count of Holland, William V (Willem van Beieren), which details the transfer of the windmill to the inhabitants of Delft. In this administrative document, the Gathuismolen is referenced under the Middle Dutch term "Gasthuse molen."

The existence of the Gasthuismolen is also corroborated by a map dated 1561 and created by Jacob van Deventer. It is then mentioned in 1582 in the context of a grain mill, although it was used in the early 17th century to grind malt for brewing beer. It is also referenced in July 1595 during the creation of a Delft square bearing its name and in 1601 in a document written by its miller, Gerrit Stevensz, which describes the destruction of a portion of the city wall near the mill.

A tempest destroyed the building in 1675.

==== Former site of De Roos and transfer and reconstruction at 111-112 Phoenixstraat ====
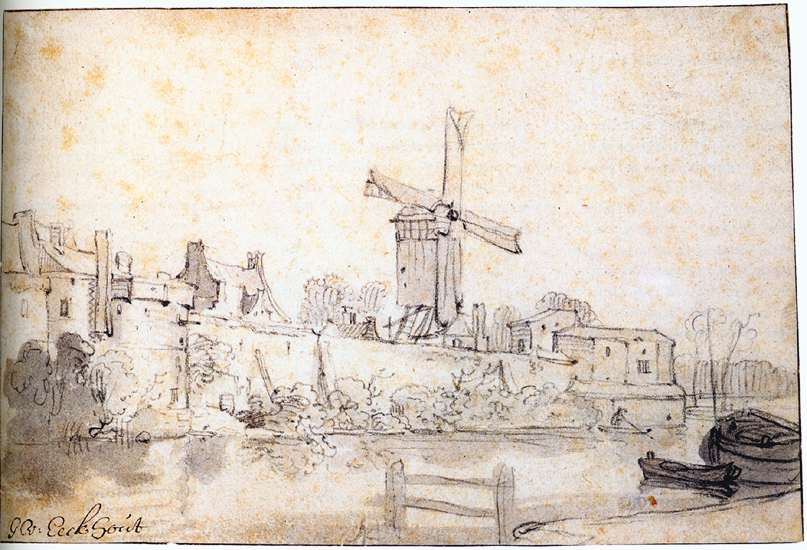
The De Roos mill rising above the southern wall of the Delft city wall, drawing by Gerbrand van den Eeckhout, second half of the 1640s.

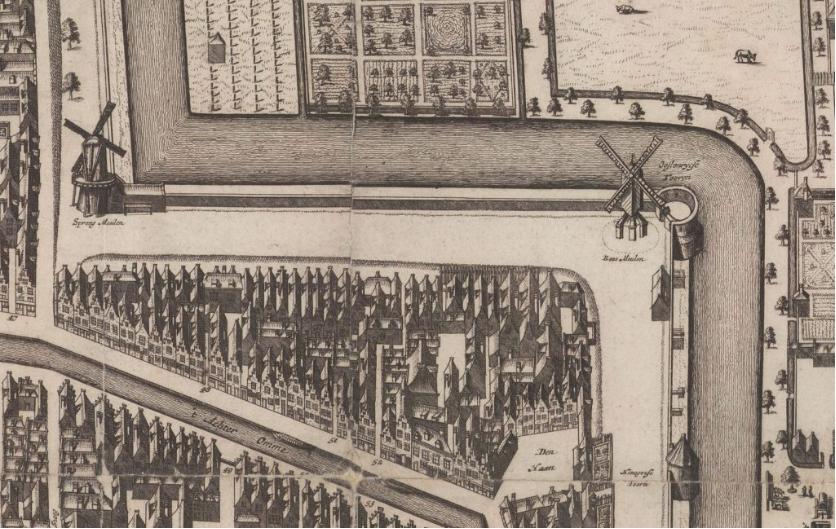
Extract from a map of Delft drawn by Johannes Verkolje in 1678, showing, on the right, the first site of the De Roos mill in the vicinity of a fortified tower (Oosterijk toren).

De Roos was initially constructed on the remains of a bastioned fortification (this section of the urban wall was destroyed during the 17th century), situated on the current Zuiderstraat — a thoroughfare in the southern part of the historic center of Delft. Subsequently, the edifice was situated near a fortified tower, designated as Oosterijke toren. The location of the initial construction site is indicated on a map dated 1678 and engraved by the Dutch painter Johannes Verkolje and published by the writer Dirck van Bleyswijck. Near the aforementioned mill was the Rotterdamse Poort, a fortified gateway that opened onto the southern city wall. (Note: The first site of the mill's establishment is at the following geographical coordinates: 52°00′24″N 4°21′47″E) It seems reasonable to posit that De Roos exhibited a similar architectural style to that of the Gasthuismolen, namely that it was initially a post mill. This element is attested by a document dated 1629 in which an accident between its string and pivot is mentioned. (Note: The document highlights the fatal fall of Pieter Hubrechtsen's wife, the miller of De Roos at the time.) Despite the paucity of evidence, it can be surmised that De Roos existed on the bastioned rondel of the Oosterijke toren by the second half of the 16th century. (Note: In the 16th century, Delft had 12 windmills, including 9 tower mills and 3 post mills. One of these mills was destroyed during the Delft City fire on May 3, 1536.) (Note: According to miller Bart Dooren, due to the lack of documentation and archives related to De Roos before 1679, the date of its transfer and reconstruction, "the exact history of the mill remains a mystery.") (Note: On a Delft map dated from the late Middle Ages, De Roos could be marked at this location; however, no evidence has corroborated this hypothesis.)

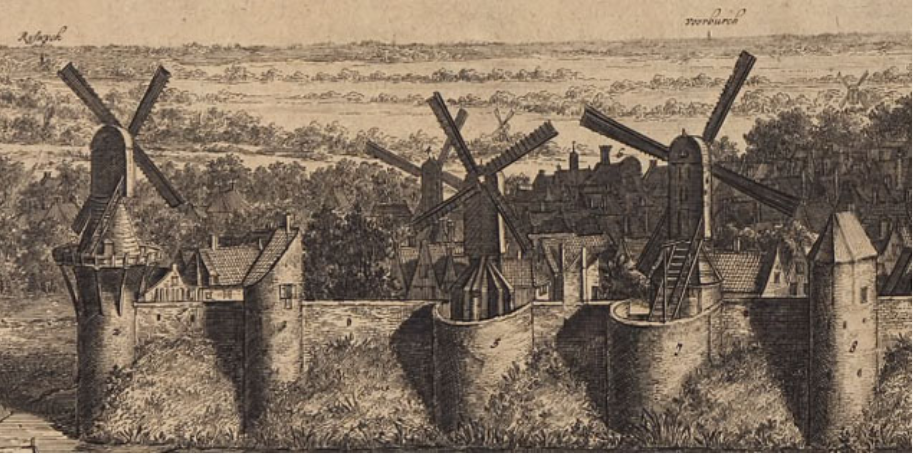
Map of the town of Delft with its mills, 1703.

In June 1679, at the behest of Cornelis van Nierop, then proprietor of the land, the De Roos mill was relocated to the site of the Gasthuismolen. The current location at 111-112 Phoenixstraat was selected due to its superior wind exposure. Subsequently, the transfer and reconstruction of the building were undertaken by civil engineer and miller Floris (or Fons) van Mierop. The windmill was constructed on the foundations of a rondel, which was located in the western section of the wall that encircled the city of Delft. The semi-circular fortification, whose remains were identified during preventive archaeological operations in the 2000s and 2010s, was constructed using bricks and stones from the 13th century that had been reused. Additionally, the archaeological investigation revealed the presence of a canal, which constituted a defensive ditch following the current Dirklangenstraat and a loop urban road with two successive intersections with Phoenixstraat. This canal was dated to the first quarter of the 14th century and measured approximately 3 meters in width. It is plausible that the De Roos was still functioning as a "post mill" during its reconstruction on the Phoenixstraat site, as any new stone mill construction would have required a special permit from the Delft authorities.

==== Second and third phases of mill construction in the late 18th and 18th centuries ====
Van Mierop died in December 1679, before the conclusion of the reconstruction initiative.

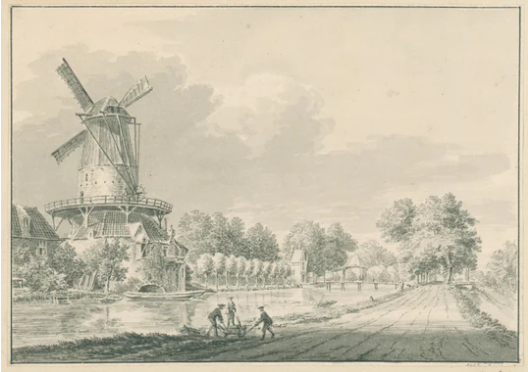
Rear view of the mill in an engraving by Hendrik Spilman (18th century).

The reconstruction work, which commenced in the late 1670s, continued apace. In November 1681, a masonry cap was placed under the hexagonal structure of the mill's skirt. Furthermore, due to the sails rotating at an insufficient height—which required a minimum elevation of at least eight feet (approximately two meters) above the ground—the municipal council determined that modifications to the mill were necessary to align with architectural standards. The structure was subsequently incorporated into a five-meter-high masonry, and a timber framework was incorporated to regulate the wheel's operation.

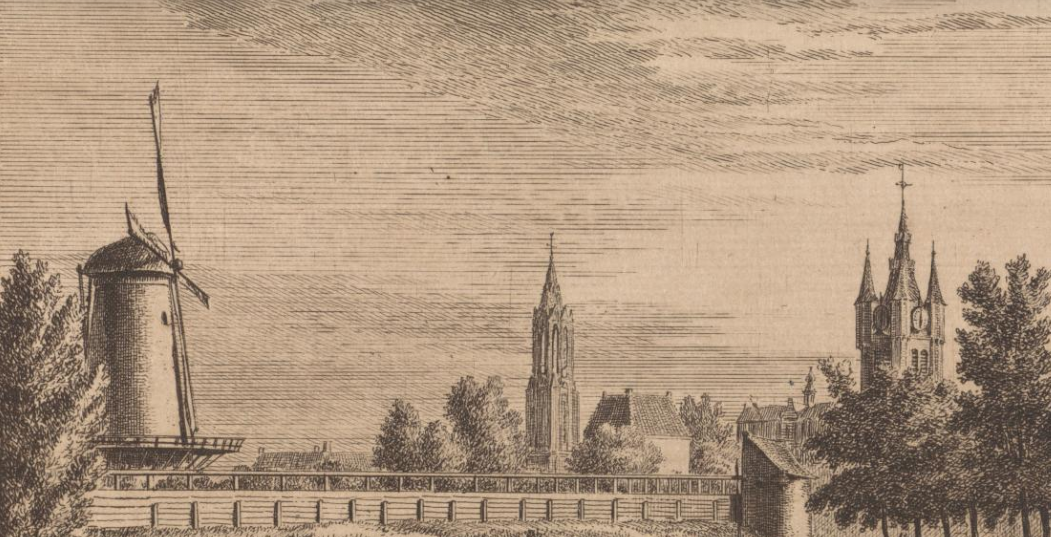
Aan de Wal te Delft, engraving by Hendrik Spilman, 18th century (between 1742 and 1784). This work depicts the De Roos mill and the Delft city.

In 1728, a semi-circular dwelling constructed from volcanic tuff was erected close to the mill. Intended to serve as a residence for the miller, this structure was complemented by the addition of a warehouse, also crafted from volcanic tuff blocks, which constituted the final element of the windmill complex.

In the 1760s, the De Roos entered its third construction phase and assumed its definitive architectural form. In approximately 1760, the De Roos, which had previously been a post mill, transformed into a tower mill. Following extensive drainage operations, the foundations were entirely re-masoned. The mill's skirt was reconstructed, and the building was raised by six meters. In January 1766, Jan de Bruyn obtained permission to install a hexagonal wooden gallery around the stone skirt of the windmill.

=== Contemporary period ===
==== From the early 19th century to the purchase of De Roos in 1926 ====
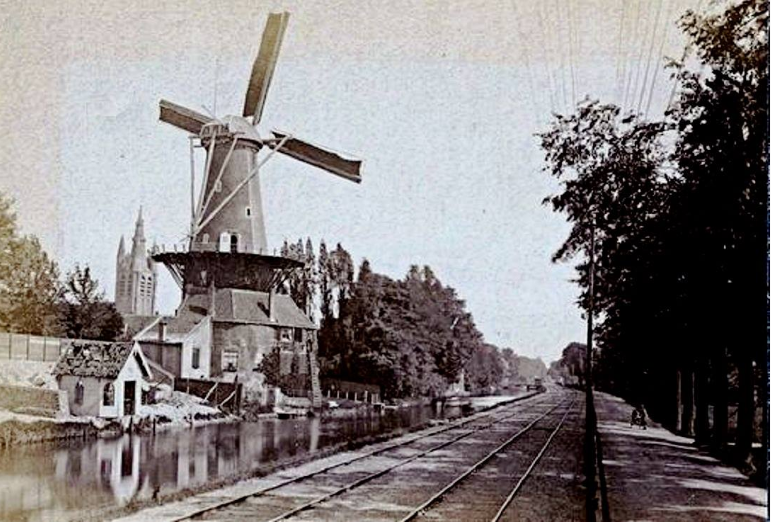
The mill in 1885 and the La Hague-Delft tramway line, which was not electrified at the time.

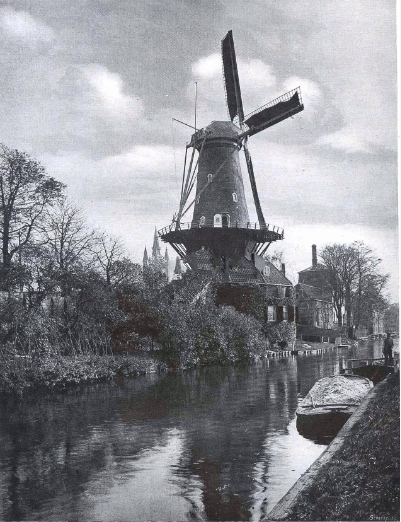
De Roos and the Wateringsevest Canal, 1915.

At the beginning of the nineteenth century, the circular base was replaced with a hexagonal masonry structure. This transformation is documented in an engraving by topographer Balthasar Jooss dated 1822.

In 1829, Pieter van Rijn, previously employed at the Niew Leven grain mill in Hazerswoude, became the proprietor of De Roos. From May 1847, a section of the inaugural Dutch railway line, constructed in 1829, ran adjacent to the Delft mill. In 1874, Pieter van Rijn's son, Klaas van Rijhn, assumed the role of miller from his father.

In the early 20th century, during the 1920s, the electrification of tramway line 1 connecting The Hague to Delft resulted in the railway track being relocated from Oude Delft to Phoenixstraat. As the mill was situated on the new route, van Rijhn assumed the responsibility of ensuring the preservation of the windmill from probable destruction. In 1922, a 25-horsepower gas engine was integrated into the mill's mechanical system.

Following the demise of Klaas van Rhijn on December 14, 1925, the Hollandsche Molen, an organization established in 1923 for the conservation of Dutch mills, purchased De Roos in 1926. This acquisition by a nonprofit entity once again averted the destruction of the mill.

==== Initial restoration work ====
In 1928, the gas engine that powered the mill's mechanism was replaced by an electric motor. The Hollandsche Molen leased the windmill and its residential outbuilding to the De Vreede family that same year. (Note: The first member of this family of millers working at the mill allegedly declared, "If I let De Roos go like De Groen and De Papegaaimolen, then I will grind it into a vestige!") They remained tenants of De Roos until 2009, with Koos de Vreede being the last family member to operate the mill.

In 1929, the construction of railway line 1 led to ground subsidence, which was further exacerbated by the drainage of groundwater by the Royal Dutch Society for the Manufacture of Chemical and Pharmaceutical Products. This resulted in a tilt to the north side of the mill and damage to the rotation mechanism of the wings. As a consequence of these events, the Hollandsche Molen initiated a restoration program for De Roos. Van Tienhoven and Visser, two members of the Hollandsche Molen's management team, collaborated with the master builders from Drop Fa. The Botenbal father-and-son team was responsible for the restoration work on the mill. The stone granary was entirely rebuilt. An iron beam was placed under the grinding floor, on which a milling vat equipped with two pairs of millstones was installed. A new support beam was added under the vertical shaft. The large lower wheel was lowered to the maximum. While the two metal sections of the vertical shaft were extended, a new stone hopper was installed for grain flow. Additionally, a bedstone paired with a runner stone, each weighing approximately five tons, and a sack hoist were incorporated into the milling system.

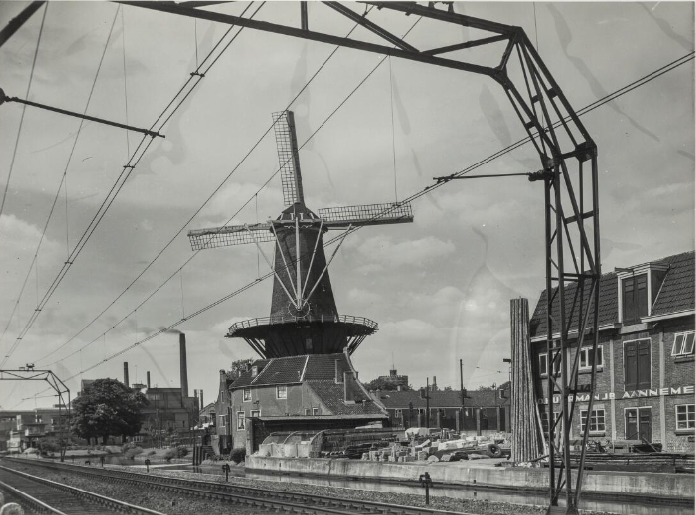
The mill and its dwelling alongside railway line 1 through Delft, linking Amsterdam to The Hague, in 1948.

In 1930, the foundations of the mill were rebuilt. The building was raised by 51 cm using a hydraulic press, and an inclined masonry cap was poured under its skirt. The repair costs amounted to 10,000 guilders. In the following years, the mill's foundation footprint was reinforced with five 20-meter-long concrete piles.

In 1936, the year the De Papegay (or De Papegaey) mill was dismantled, De Roos became the last remaining mill in Delft, out of the 18 that had been built in the city. (Note: De Roos is also the only remaining mill among the fifteen windmill buildings established on the old Delft ramparts.)

In the context of the global food shortages that resulted from the Second World War, De Roos operated at full capacity during the 1940s to meet the demand for flour. The miller was assisted by a considerable workforce during this period. In 1942, despite the financial constraints of World War II affecting the Hollandsche Molen, the association provided funding for the restoration of De Roos's residential house, amounting to 7,000 guilders. Following the conclusion of hostilities, the mill resumed its full operational capacity. However, in the 1950s, despite its pivotal role during the preceding era the windmill began to deteriorate due to a lack of adequate maintenance. Repairs were initiated in 1959.

==== Consequences of the construction of the railway viaduct and listing as Dutch National Monuments ====
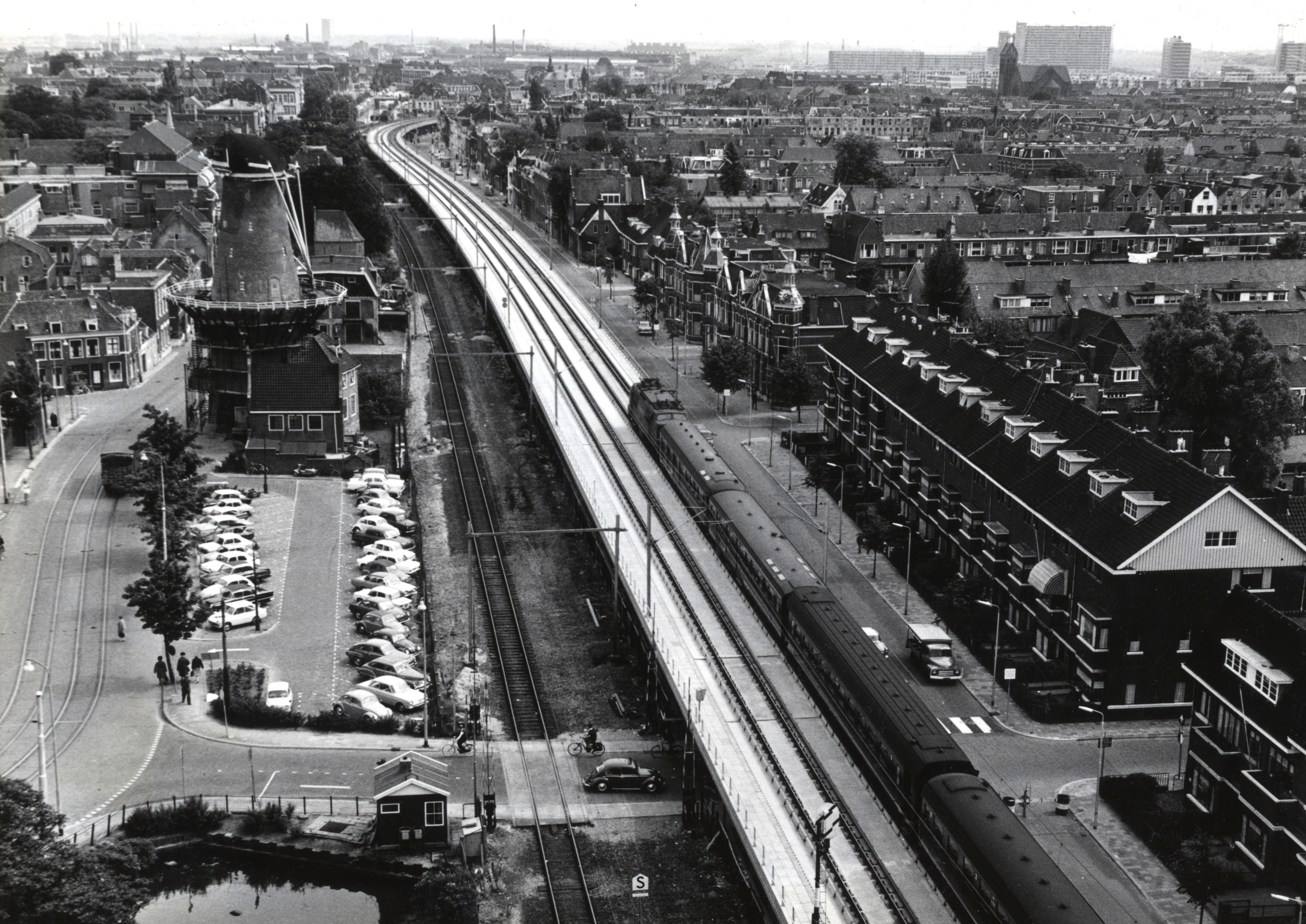
A bird's-eye view of the De Roos mill on Phoenixstraat, stripped of its green wings and flanked by the Delft railway viaduct winding over the Wateringsevest, July 1965.

In 1961, the windmill's wheel was dismantled due to the malfunctioning of its mechanism. The structure was subsequently repaired and resumed operation in 1964. Concurrently, in early 1961, an 800-meter-long railway viaduct was erected to supplant the tramway line segment traversing the western portion of Delft's town center. The viaduct commenced operations in 1965, situated parallel to Phoenixstraat and adjacent to De Roos. Subsequently, the wings of De Roos were again halted on March 23, June 1, July 6, and September 7 and 14, 1965.

On June 29, 1967, the mill and the miller's house, like numerous other buildings in Delft, were designated national monuments by the Dutch Cultural Heritage Agency.

In November 1975, the Delft mill was showcased in a television program designed for a youth audience, titled Het Programma met de Muis. The report, broadcast by the Nederlandse Omroep Stichting, demonstrated the processes of flour production and mill operation through the actions of miller Niek de Vreede, accompanied by detailed explanations. From 1975 to 1983, de Vreede operated the mill with the assistance of volunteer millers. On August 18, 1979, to commemorate the 300th anniversary of the mill's construction, the mayor and the council of Delft organized a celebratory event throughout the city.

==== Restoration work in the 1980s and 1990s ====
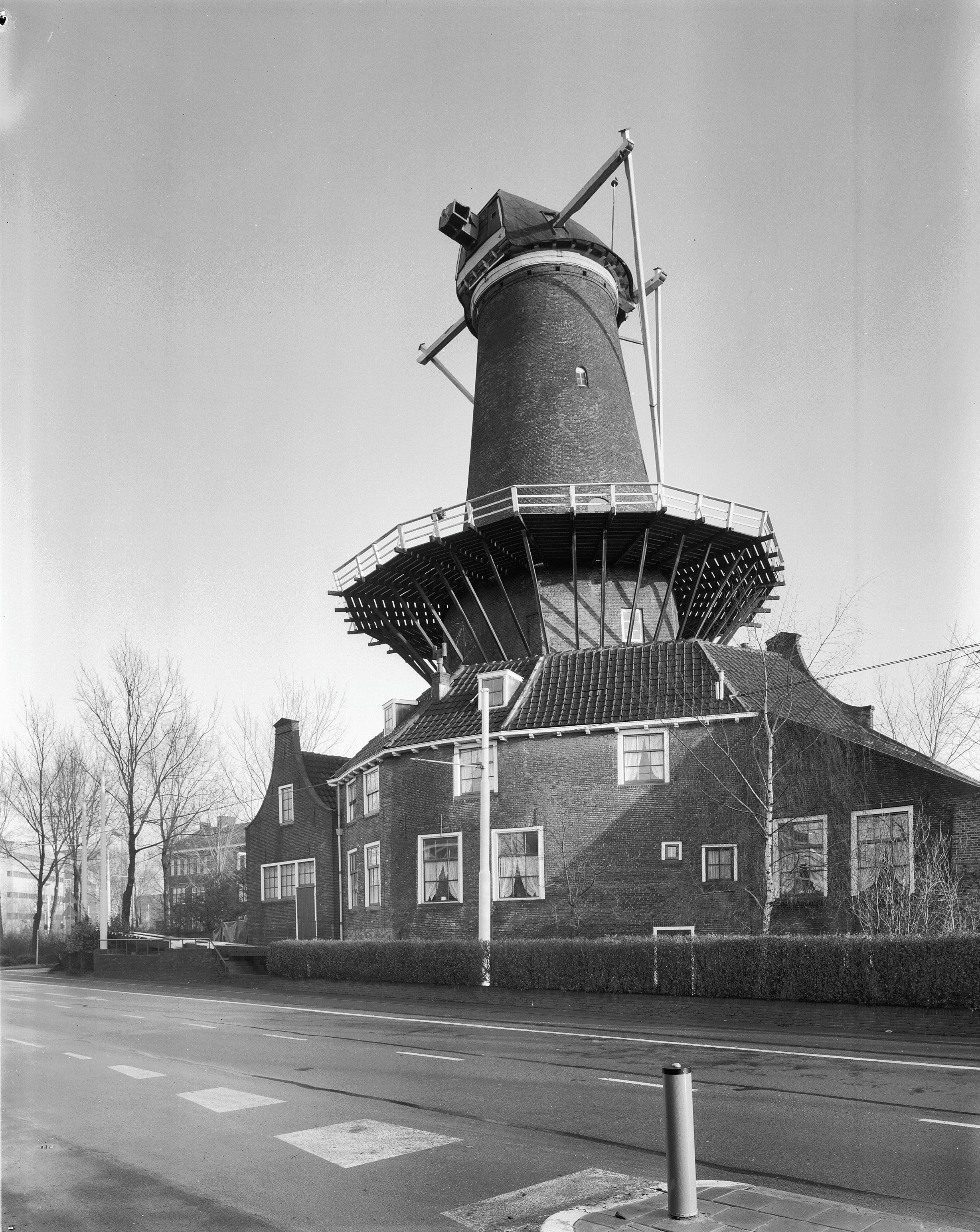
The mill, restored and without its wheel, in 1985.

In 1984, the mill exhibited further deterioration. On the night of February 14–15, the wings ceased turning. This deterioration was attributed to a subsidence of the masonry above the hexagonal gallery and a malfunction of the rotating cap.

The restoration work, which commenced in November 1988, entailed the removal of the cap and the raising of the upper portion of the mill's skirt, which weighed approximately 240 tons. This was achieved using 35 centrally controlled hydraulic jacks anchored through 40 holes drilled to a depth of 1.3 meters into the skirt. The jacks were employed to exert a force that would push the skirt upwards. The work continued in March/April 1989, with the jacks still holding the circular structure above the platform. The base, a brick-and-mortar assembly, was re-masoned, and the inclination was raised by approximately 40 centimeters. (Note: Two large bands of shoring placed around the base of the circular structure of the mill, one made of metal and the other of wood, allow the masonry to be shuttered.) The new rotating cap, replacing the previous 19th-century one, was installed in early 1990.

On June 19, 1990, a 120-ton mobile crane was utilized to affix the cap to the mill's skirt. Additionally, new metal shafts for the wings and new millstones were hoisted and integrated into the mill structure.

To fund the restoration of the mill, which was not feasible with the resources available from the Hollandsche Molen Association, a foundation was established in 1986, called the Stichting Molen de Roos. (Note: Fundraising partly relies on selling screen prints depicting the mill created by engraver Sees Vlag. Each screen-printed copy, titled "Stichting Molen De Roos" (De Roos Mill Foundation), is then sold for 195 guilders.) The foundation's fundraising efforts resulted in a total of 200,000 guilders, in addition to the 70,000 guilders initially allocated by the association for the restoration of the Dommerholt mill (Note: The total cost of repairs amounted to 500,000 guilders, with 350,000 dedicated to the mill and 150,000 to the miller's house.) in Epse. These funds enabled the restoration of De Roos. The renovated mill was inaugurated by the Dutch Prince Consort Claus von Amsberg on September 28, 1990.

In the spring of 1996, to commemorate the 750th anniversary of the city's establishment by William II of Holland, the mill's wings were embellished with four white sails featuring nuances of Delft blue. Delftware tiles depicting De Roos were commissioned for this occasion.

==== Construction of the Delft railway tunnel and archaeological excavations (2000s and 2010s) ====
===== Construction of the Delft railway tunnel under the mill =====
In 2004, the viaduct of railway line no. 1. The project's impact on the morphology and landscape of Delft's town center (including the mill) was a significant factor in the Minister of Transport and Water Management, Karla Peijs, approving the construction of a railway tunnel. (Note: Regarding the regular passage of trains running on the railway viaduct facing De Roos, one of the millers who worked in the Delft windmill commented, "A mill is not a watchtower.") The route of the underground railway infrastructure, measuring 2.3 km in length, 24 meters in width, situated at a depth of 10 meters, and comprising four tracks, passed beneath the mill. In July 2012, the 1100 tons of the windmill complex were lifted to a height of one meter to allow for the commencement of the planned work. The jacking operation, conducted with the assistance of computer-aided technology and subcontracted to the engineering company CT de Boer, proceeded in incremental steps of 33 mm. The operation of lifting the national building, which was carried out with the assistance of 45 jacks, was completed in a single day. During the tunnel construction on Phoenixstraat, the windmill building and its domestic outbuilding were supported by a pile structure. While the jacking operation was underway, a reinforced concrete base was poured at the site of 111-112 Phoenixstraat. This provided a new course for the windmill building, its dwelling and its warehouse. The complex was subsequently placed back in its original location in December 2012.

During the operations involving De Roos, the mill came under the administrative authority of ProRail, a public body responsible for the railway tunnel excavation work. Furthermore, the budget allocated by the province of South Holland for the work on the windmill building, specifically repairs of the masonry joints around the openings on the first floor of the skirt superstructure and the installation of a new concrete slab, amounted to a cost of €76,000.

In the latter half of the 2000s, a permanent exhibition was installed within the mill. In May 2009, as a result of plans to construct a public parking garage (the Prinsenhofgarage) reserved for users of the William of Orange railway tunnel, the miller Koos de Vreede, then the proprietor of a specialty animal feed shop occupying the land designated for the future parking lot, was expropriated from De Roos.

The mill reopened on September 4, 2013. This date also marks the return of the de Roos to the real estate administered by the Hollandsche Molen association, as well as the publication of a book devoted to its history. On the night of February 21 to 22, 2015, the last train on the railway viaduct passed in front of the mill.

The De Roos mill and the construction work of the railway tunnel on Phoenixstraat in Delft

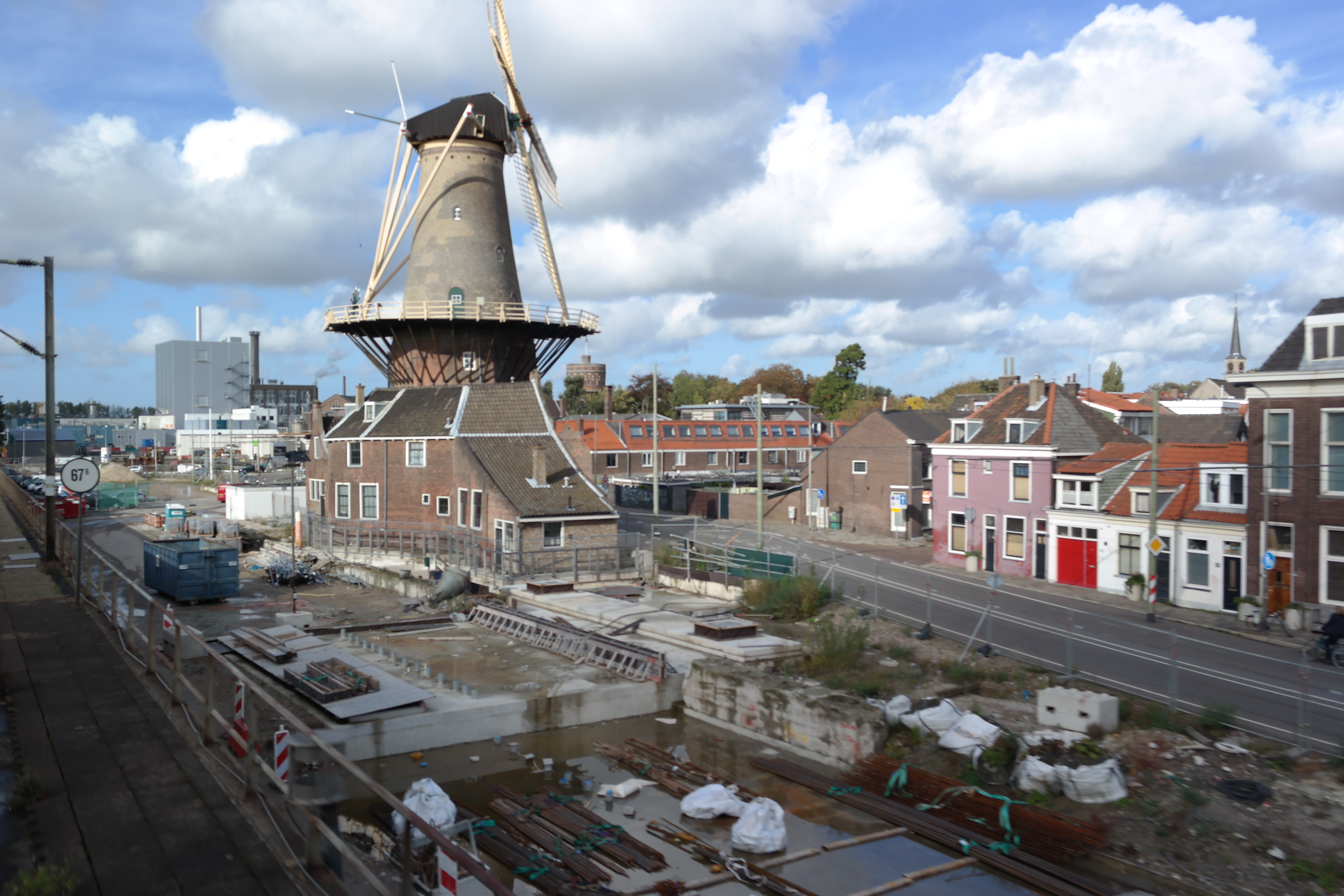
Construction work on the railway tunnel around and under the mill in October 2014.

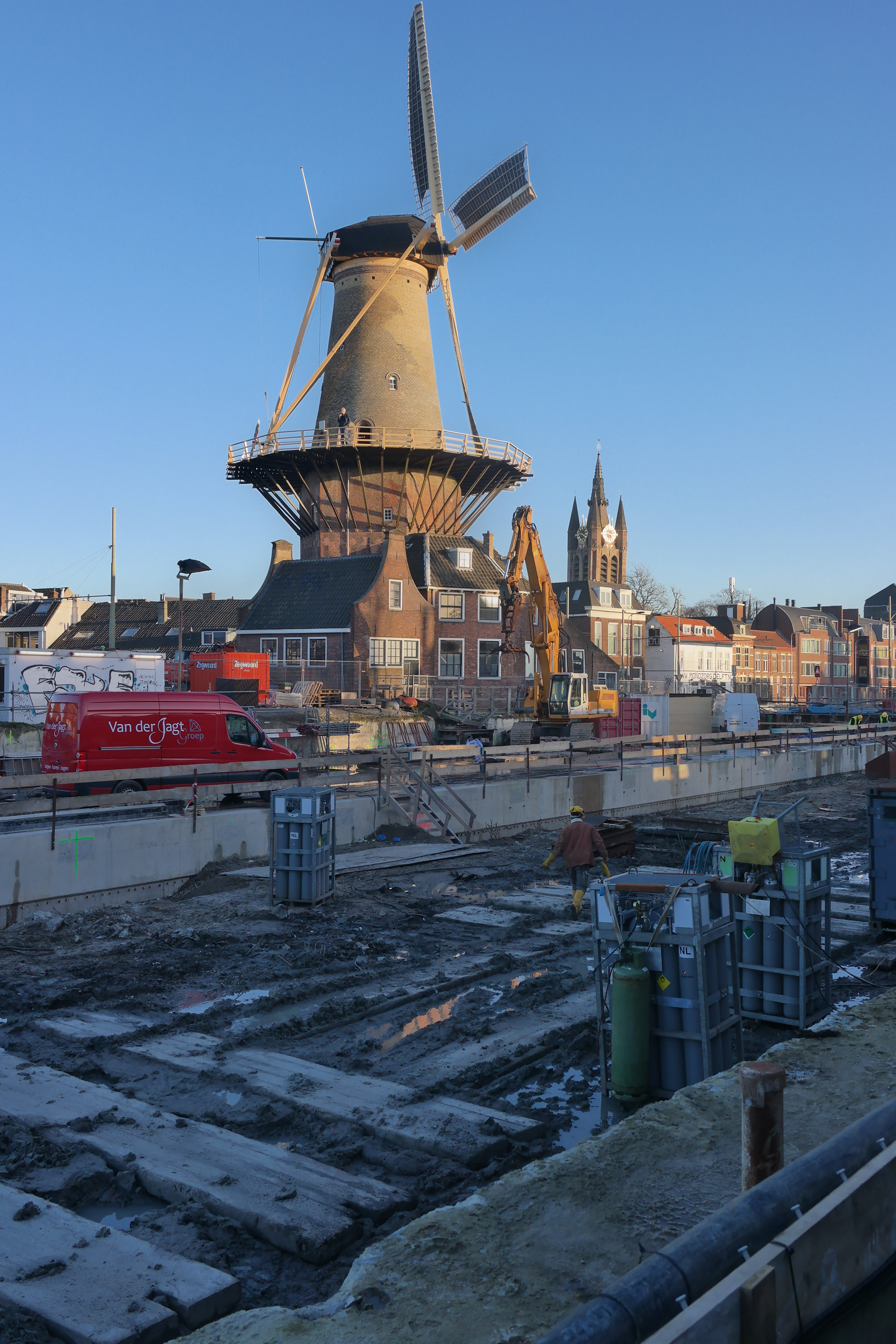
Photo in January 2016.

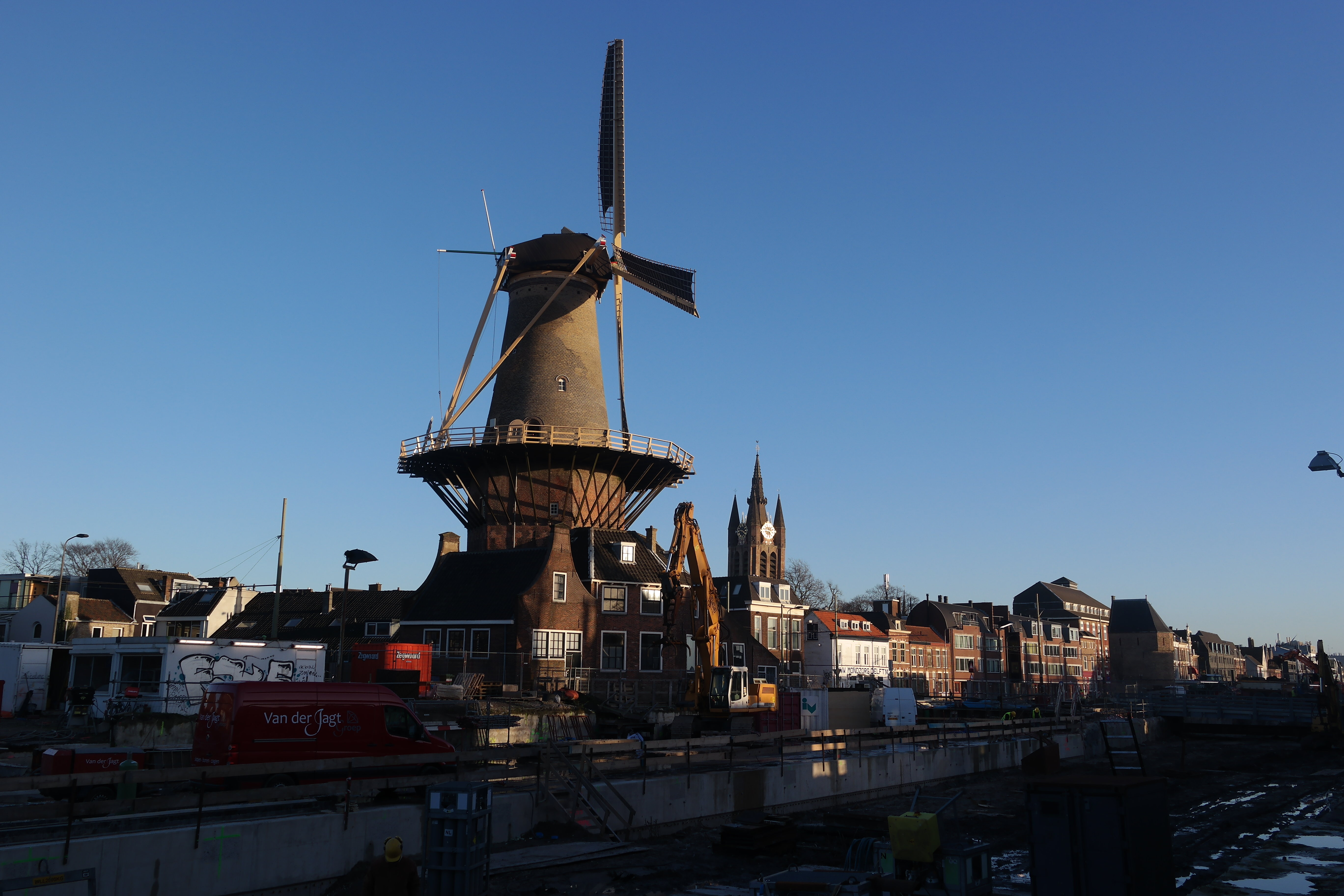
January 2016.

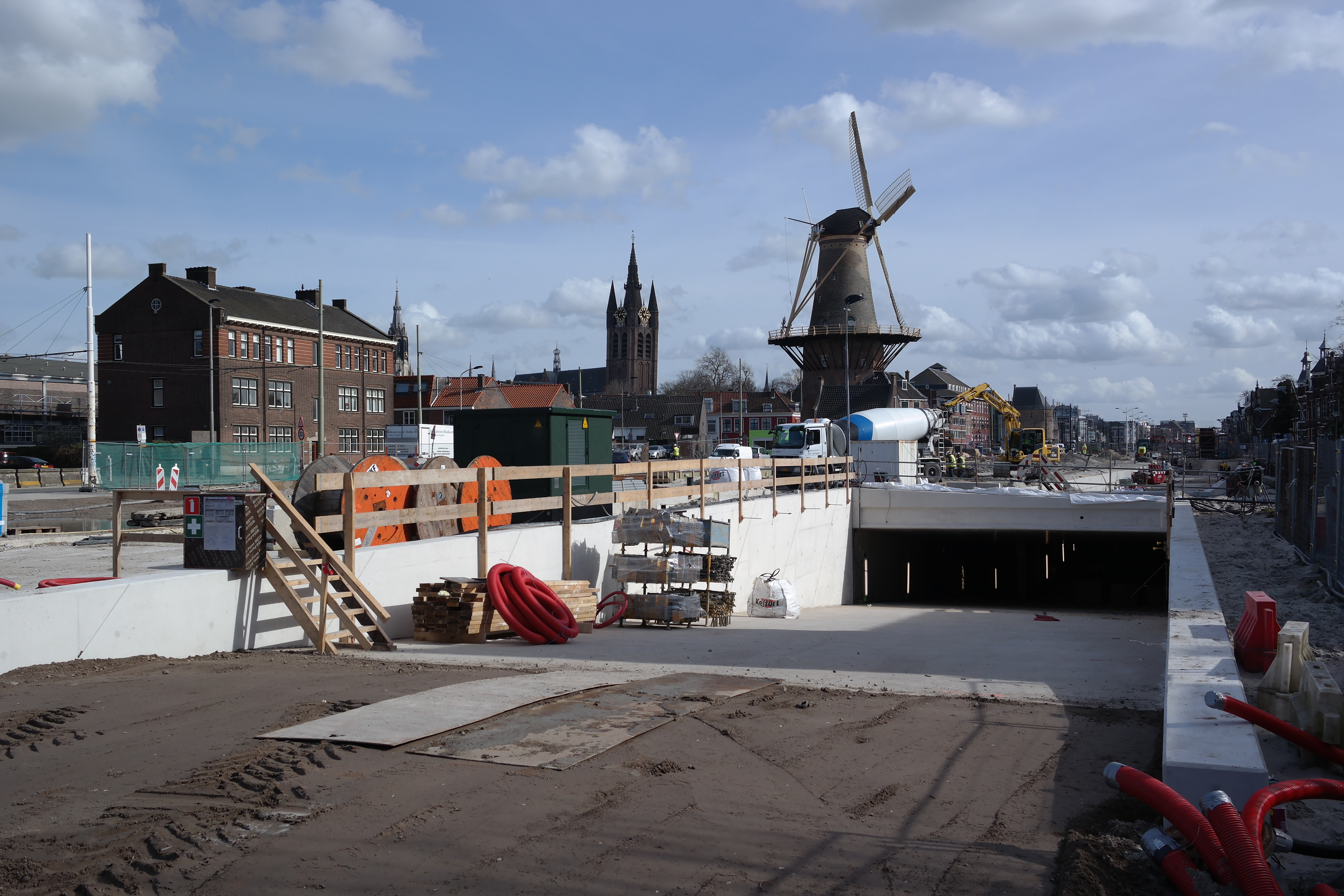
March 2017.

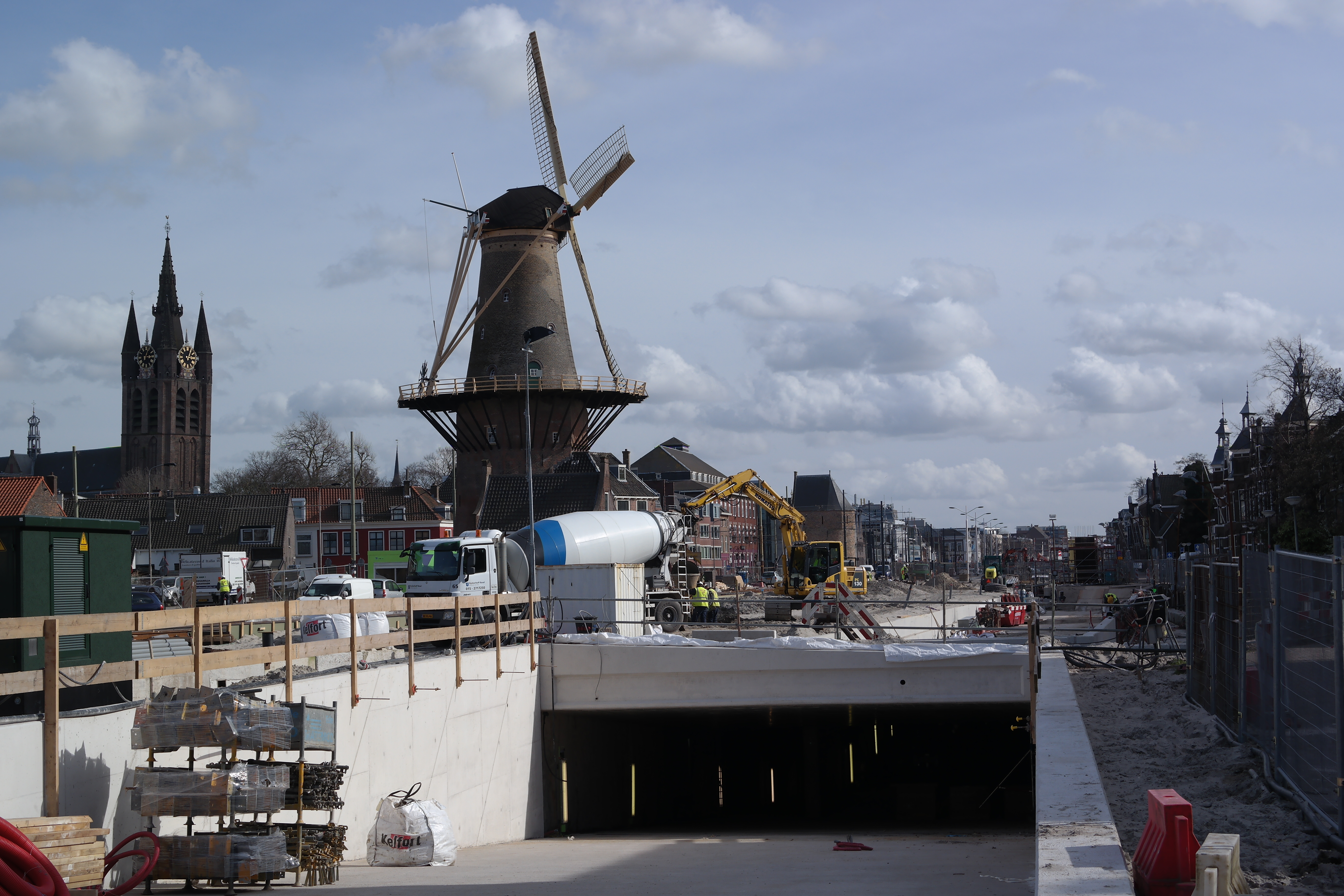
March 2017.

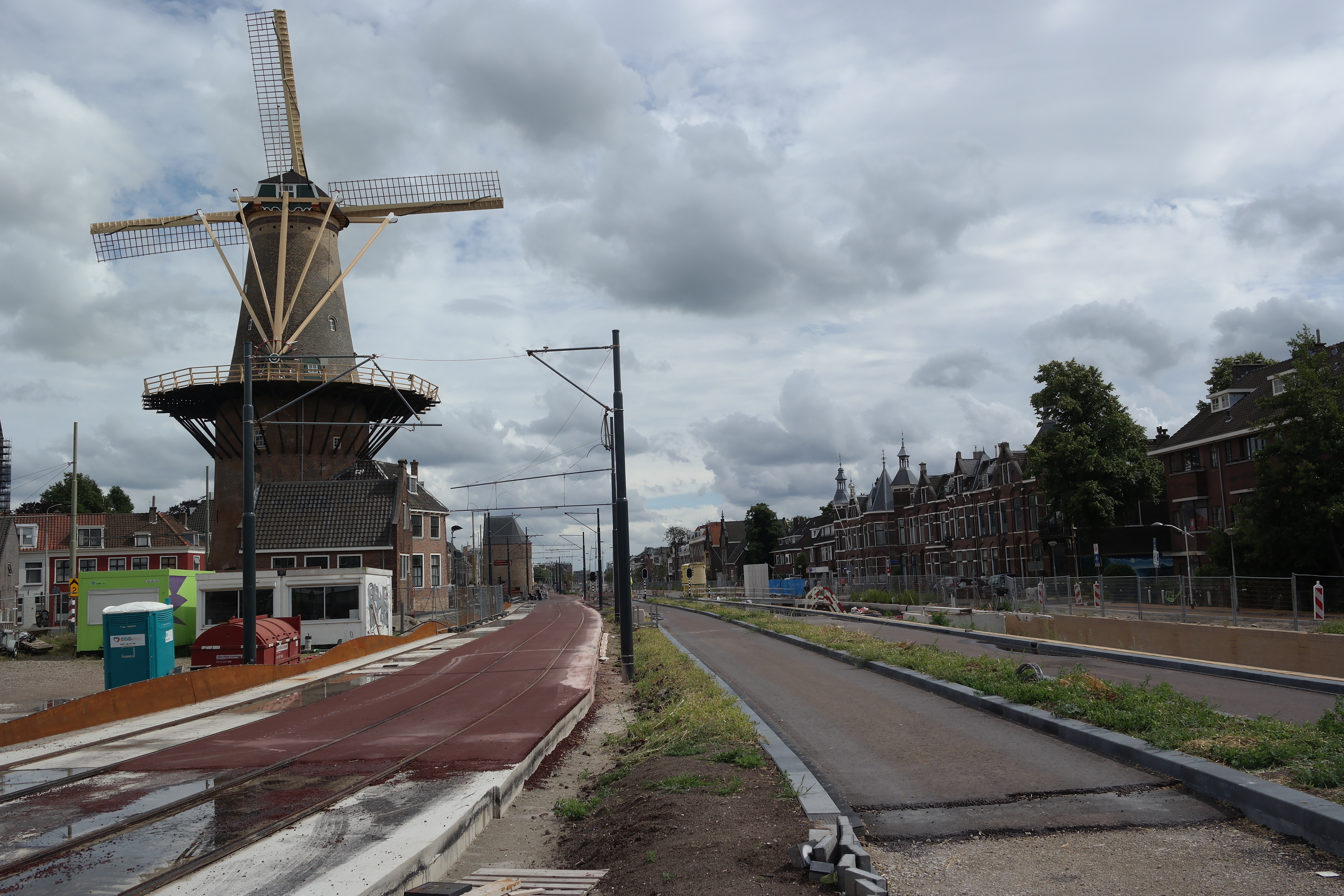
July 2017.

===== Archaeological excavations =====
While the grain mill and its associated dwelling were elevated by one meter, the Heritage Service of the city of Delft and its surrounding area (Erfgoed Delft en omstreken) conducted preventive excavations at the Phoenixstraat site. These archaeological research operations were also conducted under the auspices of the Dutch Cultural Heritage Agency.

In 2008, De Roos oversaw the excavation of a trench measuring 20 meters in length and one meter in width. This endeavor yielded insights into the original foundations of the mill and the remnants of the city's ancient fortifications, including a rampart, a bastion, a tower, and a moat. In March 2009, three sondage pits were excavated using a mini-excavator on the land surrounding the windmill building. The initial exploration trench yielded a stratigraphy 2.3 meters thick, comprising a meter of recent fill, primarily sand, followed by 0.5 meters of construction rubble mixed with blue clay by oxidation-reduction processes, and finally, 190 centimeters of the former moat's fill. The second trench exhibited a comparable stratigraphic profile, if not an identical one, to that of the initial test pit. The third trench revealed the remains of a foundation, spanning a depth of 0.50 meters, belonging to a structure situated between De Roos and the Bagijntoren, one of the fortified towers of Delft's fortifications.

The archaeological excavations unearthed two millstones crafted from blue volcanic stone. The two-grain millstones, found in an almost intact state, were originally part of the grinding mechanism of the Delft mill. In addition, domestic deposits, dated to the 17th century and found in a good state of preservation, were also identified during the excavation campaign. Finally, debris from the mill's facades in its first and second states—before the reconstruction of its skirt in 1760—was found within the stratigraphic layers of the city wall.

==== Developments in the late 2010s and repair work in the 2020s ====
In 2015, the opening of a shop called Ambacht within the mill marked the beginning of a new venture for De Roos. In addition to supplying local bakeries, the company began providing flour to individuals, restaurants, and DOEL, a subdivision of GGZ Delfland, a structure dedicated to improving the quality of life for people with psychiatric disorders. As indicated in the August 2015 monthly report on the future of Dutch mills, the opening of this specialty shop, along with the hosting of visitors due to the installation of an exhibition room, transformed the De Roos mill into a "secondary destination" that extended beyond its primary flour production activity.

In 2019, informational panels were installed outside and inside the mill for the benefit of visitors and customers. Some of the signs were designed to provide information and an explanation of the history and various functions of the mill from an educational perspective. Others were intended to comply with safety standards and displayed instructions for safe operation. A new lighting system, including rotating LED lamps, was also installed inside the mill. During the same year, an exhibition was set up within De Roos with the theme "Mills, the Engine of the Golden Age in Delft" ("Molens, de motor van de Gouden Eeuw in Delft").

The early 2020s saw a further deterioration of the mill's wheel. The cracks observed in October 2022 were present within the two metal axes that constitute the structure of the wings, thereby hindering the continuous rotation of the wheel.

A crowdfunding campaign was initiated to facilitate the replacement of the two metal rods. The fundraising effort yielded €15,000. The Delft windmill underwent repairs and was inaugurated by Queen Beatrix in May 2023, coinciding with National Mill Day.

De Roos mill in the late 2010s and early 2020s

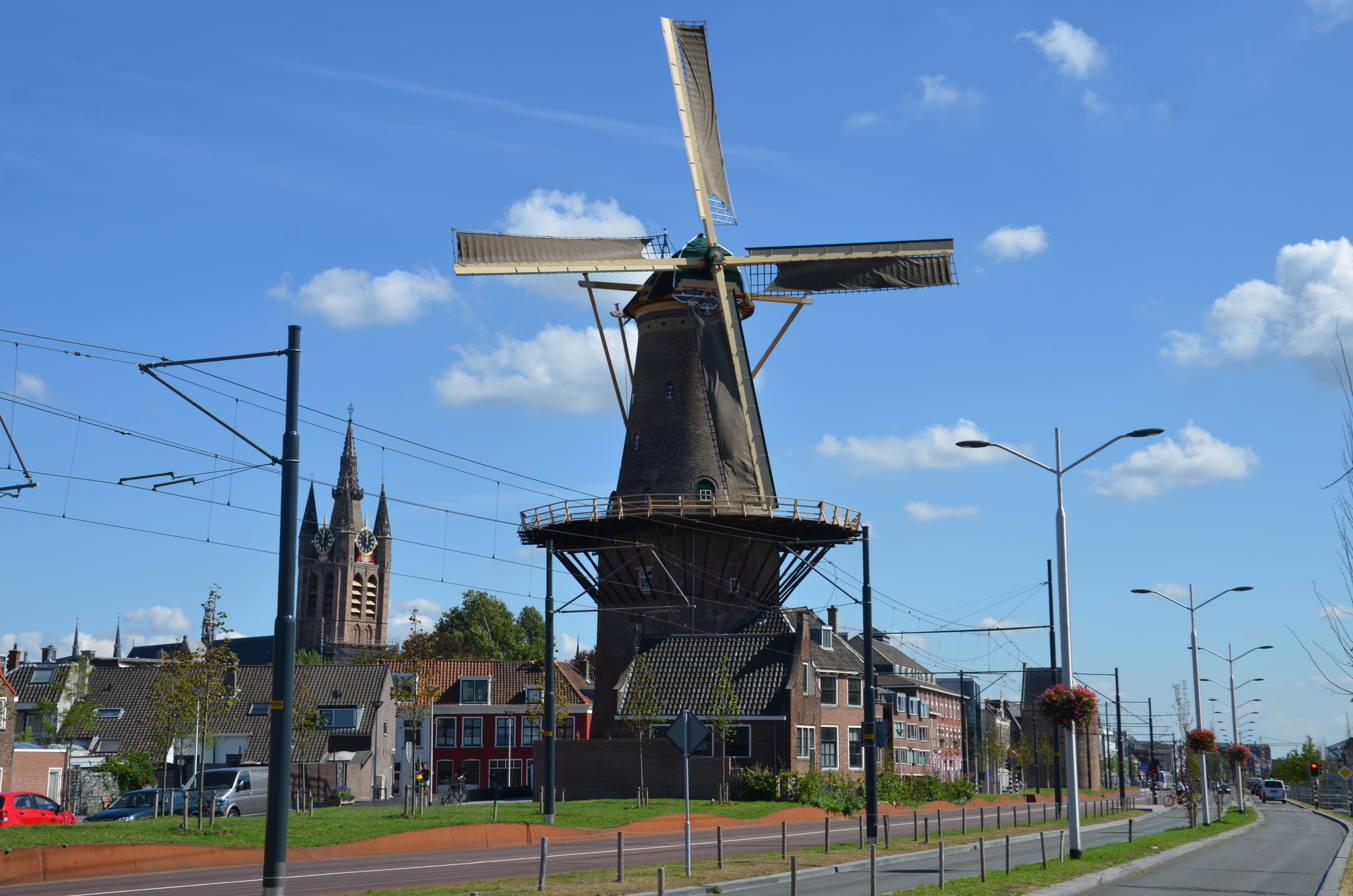
De Roos and its dwelling along Phoenixstraat, with the bell tower of the Oude Kerk visible on the left, in August 2018.

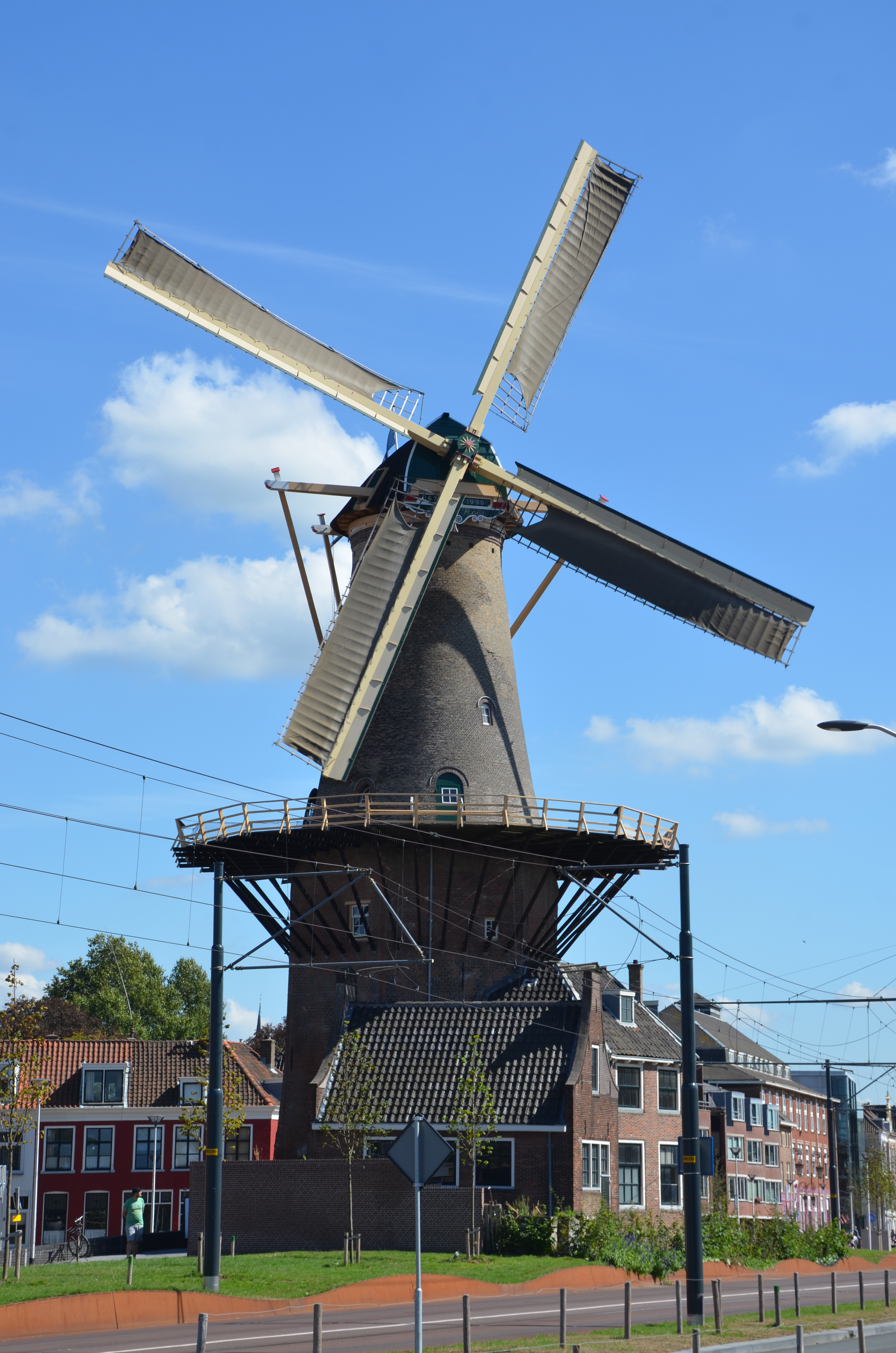
Close-up of the De Roos complex in Delft town center in August 2018.

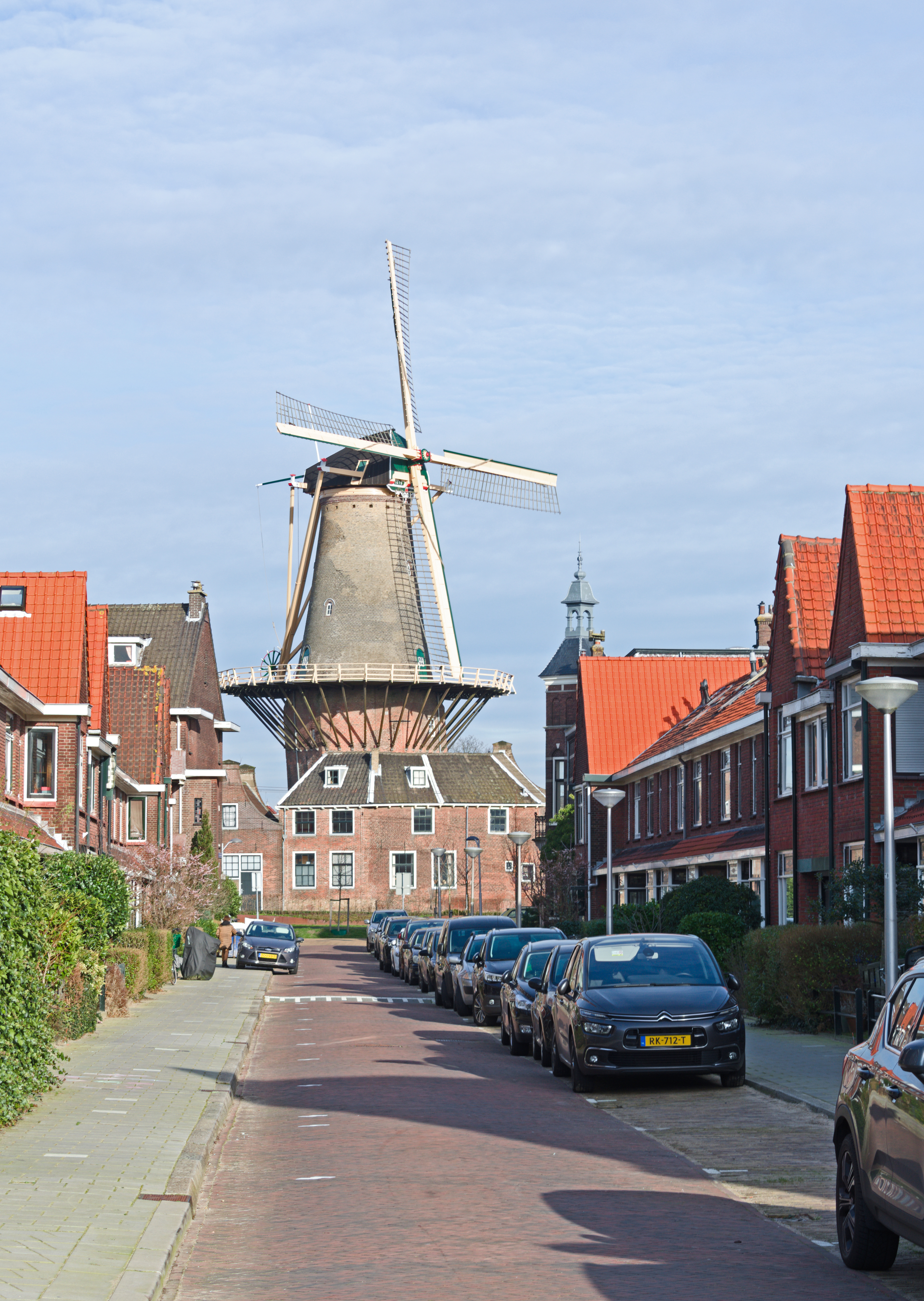
The mill visible at the end of Vanheemstrastraat, Delft, in February 2022.

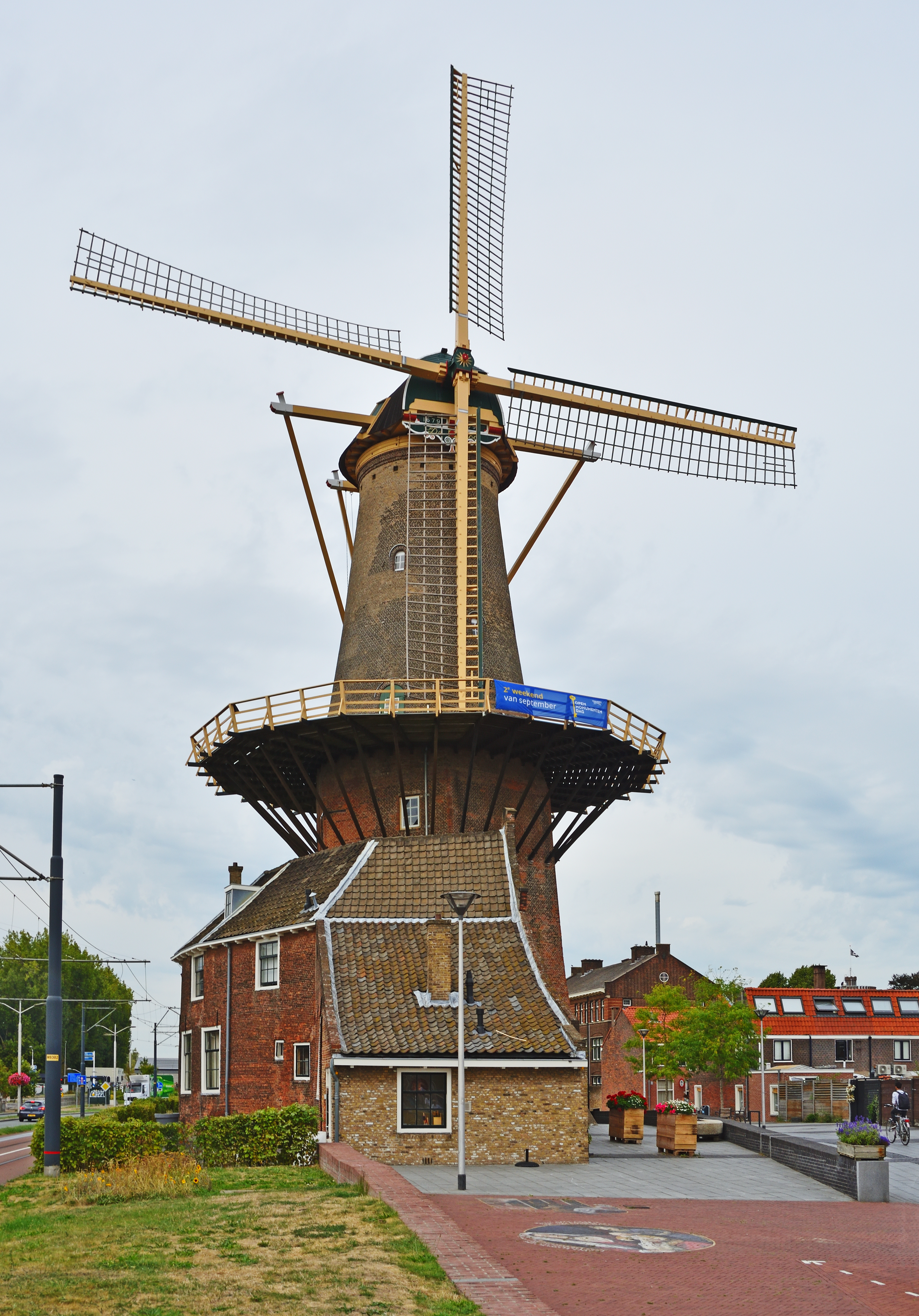
The De Roos complex, its forecourt, the Phoenixstraat visible on the left, in September 2022.

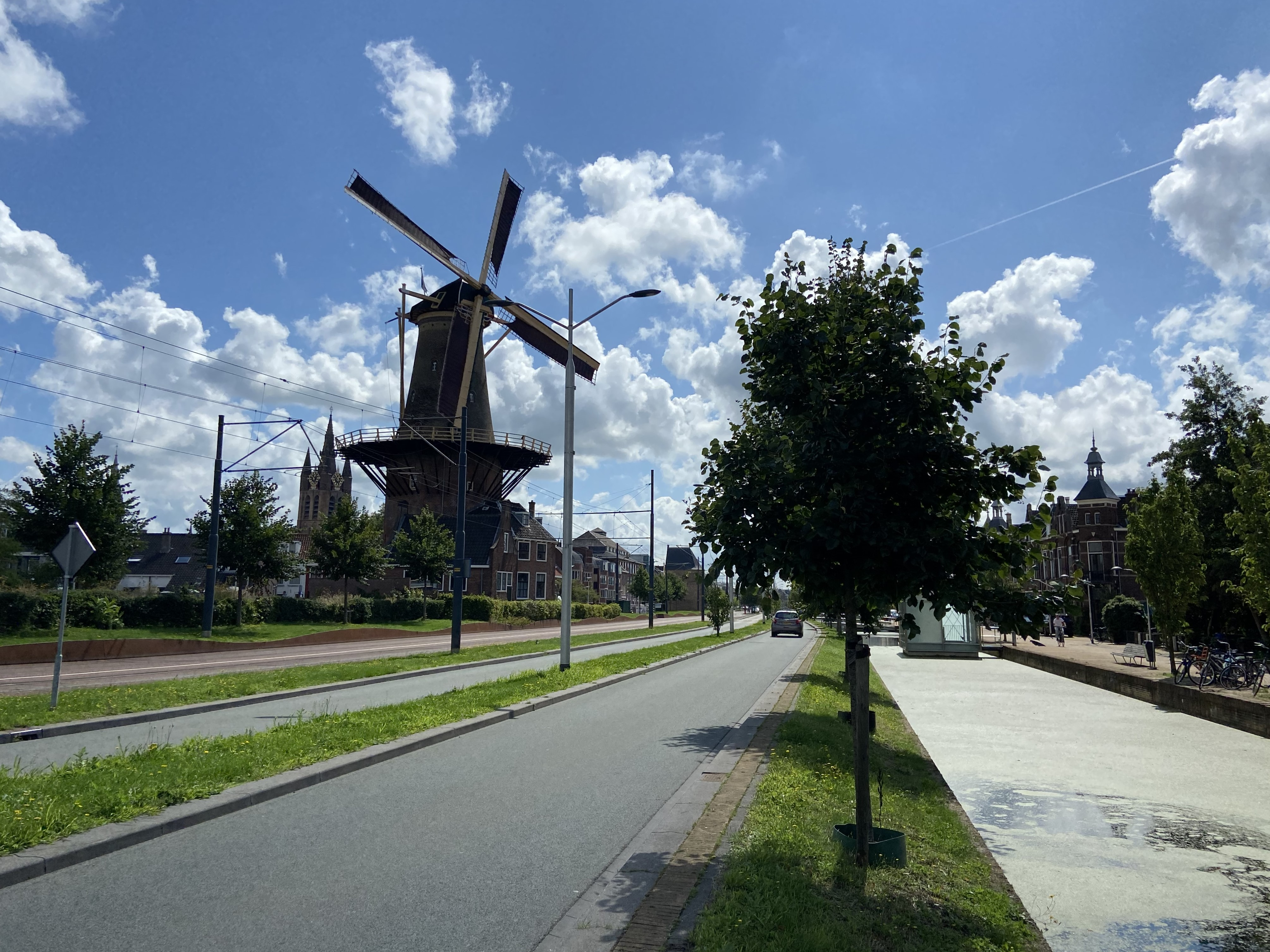
The mill, its dwelling and warehouse along the Phoenixstraat in August 2023.

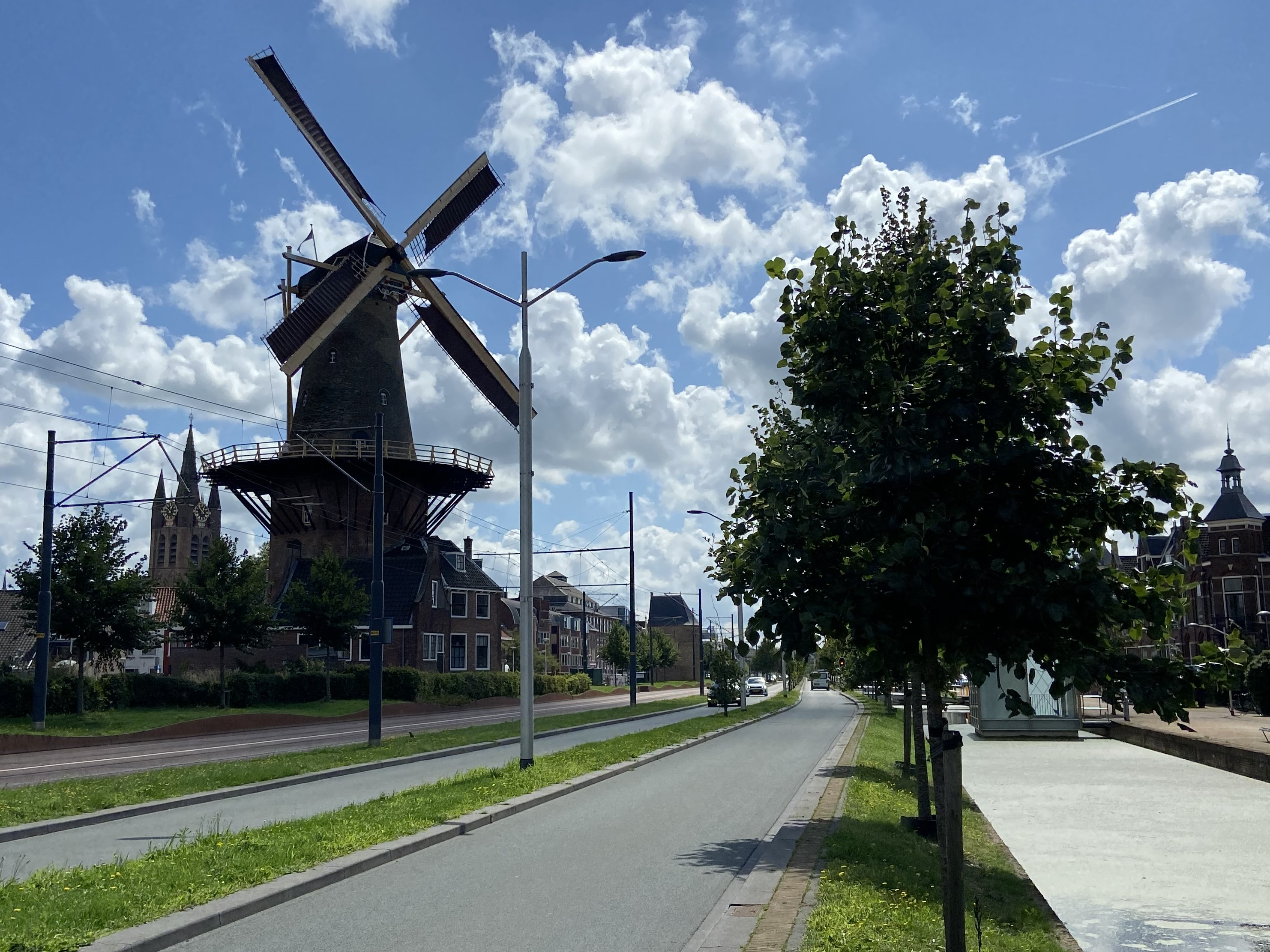
The mill, its dwelling and warehouse along the Phoenixstraat in August 2023.

== List of De Roos millers ==
The following table presents a non-exhaustive list of individuals who have demonstrated the ability to operate the mill successfully:

| No. | Start of Milling | End of Milling | Miller's Name |
|---|---|---|---|
| 1 | Early 17th century | - | Pieter Hubrechtsen |
| 2 | - | 1679 | Floris van Mierop |
| 3 | Mid-18th century | - | Cornelis van Dijk |
| 4 | Late 18th century | - | Jan van Bruyn |
| 5 | Around 1800 | 1827 | Kouwenboven family |
| 6 | 1827 | - | Pieter van Rhijn (Note: While the van Rhijn family served at De Roos, the Delft mill was also called "de molen Van Rhijn," and its cap bore the inscription "Molen Roos K. v. Rhijn 1851.") |
| 7 | - | 1925 | Klaas van Rhijn |
| 8 | 1913 | 1928 | Kobus van Rhijn |
| 9 | 1929 | - | Koos I J.A. de Vreede (Note: Before operating De Roos, the De Vreede family ran Groenmolen, a Delft windmill built in 1733 and destroyed in 1928. In one of De Roos's attics, there is a stone plaque with the inscription: Anno 1733-6-1 Is deese Groene Meulen gestigt door Eduart van Herwyne en Mephiboseth van de Woestyne) |
| 10 | - | 1987 | Niek de Vreede |
| 11 | 1987 | 2009 | Koos II de Vreede |
| 12 | 2010 | - | Bart Dooren |
| 13 | 2012 | - | Evert van Bokhorst |
| 14 | 2015 | - | Marga Scheffen |
| 15 | 2018 | - | Jan Spruit |
| 16 | 2019 | - | Herman Polderman |
| 17 | 2019 | - | André van der Kraan |
| 18 | 2022 | - | Dirk Pereboom |

== Architecture, characteristics, and description ==
In addition to the aforementioned mill, the De Roos complex, which has been designated a national monument, encompasses a residential dwelling and a warehouse. The aggregate mass of the three edifices is 1,100 tons, with the mill accounting for 800 tons of that total.

=== Mill ===
==== Description and characteristics ====
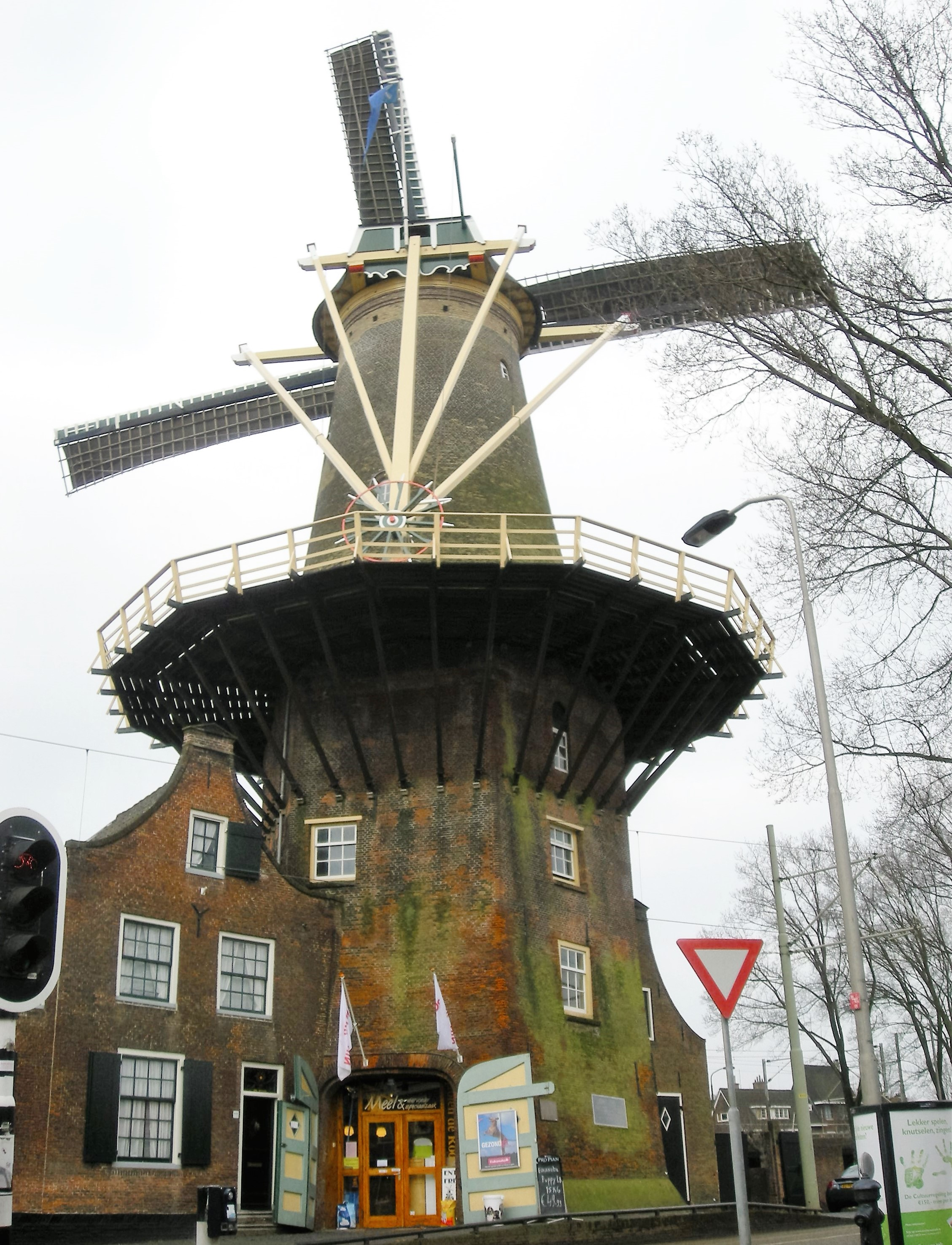
Overview of the mill.

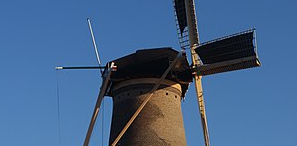
Close-up of the rotating cap.

The mill's cap is a timber structure covered with shingles, which have been waterproofed using bituminous felt. It is adorned with a green and white painted fronton featuring two chronograms—1679 and 1990—which respectively refer to the date of the reconstruction of De Roos on the Phoenixstraat site and its inauguration after restoration works in the 1980s. In addition, the front displays the mill's name.

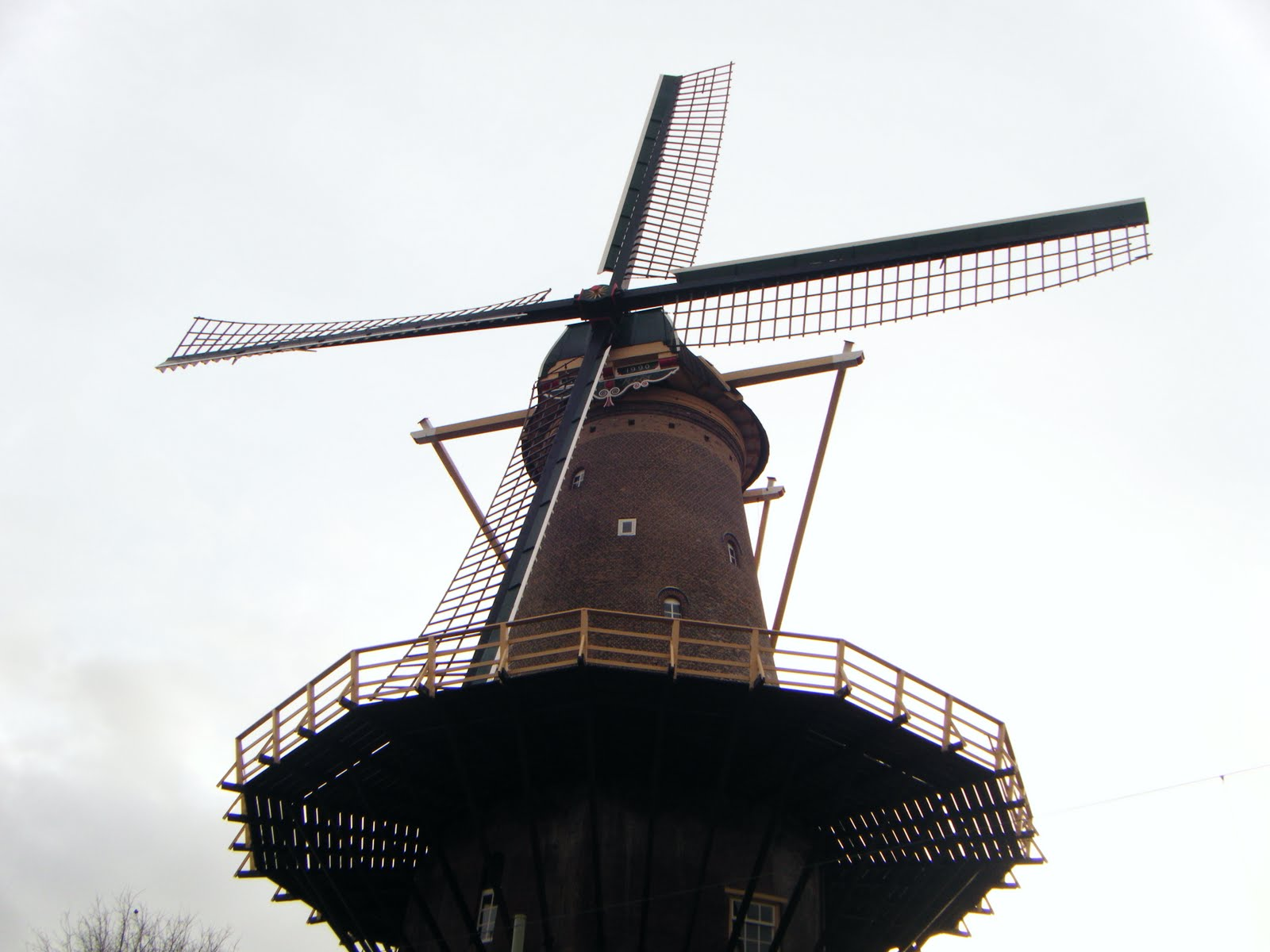
Brick skirt superstructure, hexagonal gallery and mill wheel.

The windmill comprises a ground floor and seven levels (floors and attics), with four levels (including the ground floor) dedicated to the hexagonal structure and four levels for the circular structure. From the ground floor, which rests on a floor with a thickness of 0.39 meters, to the attic, the eight levels of the mill rise to respective heights of 2.60 meters, 2.60 meters, 2.80 meters, 3.85 meters, 4.90 meters, 5.10 meters, 5.30 meters, and 5.50 meters. The dimensions of the remaining floors are 5.10 m, 5.10 m, 2.20 m, 2.05 m, and 1.7 m, respectively. The uppermost floor is an attic, referred to as a kapzolder, constructed as an extension of the rotating cap. The two structures are integrated into a single unit. The sixth floor is utilized for the lifting process, while the fifth floor is employed for pouring grains contained in sacks. The fourth floor, which features an extended floor area due to the incorporation of the hexagonal gallery, is primarily utilized for the grinding and milling of grains, as well as the packaging of the resulting flour in sacks. The sacks filled with grains and those filled with flour are stored in a dedicated storage area on the third floor. The second floor is dedicated to exhibitions and is set up as a museum. The first floor is used for weighing and packaging the obtained flour. The ground floor is primarily utilized for storing grain sacks and selling flour packages. One of the six sides of the skirt tower is pierced with an entrance, which is closed by a double-leaf gate measuring 2.4 meters in width.

The structure reaches a total height of 32 meters. Approximately midway up the skirt of the mill is a hexagonal wooden gallery or platform. The skirt tower encircles the masonry structure of the building with a width of 3 m. The height of the skirt tower from the platform to its top (the cap) is 12 m, while the height from the base to the gallery is 13 m. The platform is equipped with spotlights, each delivering 400 W, which allow the miller to work at night.

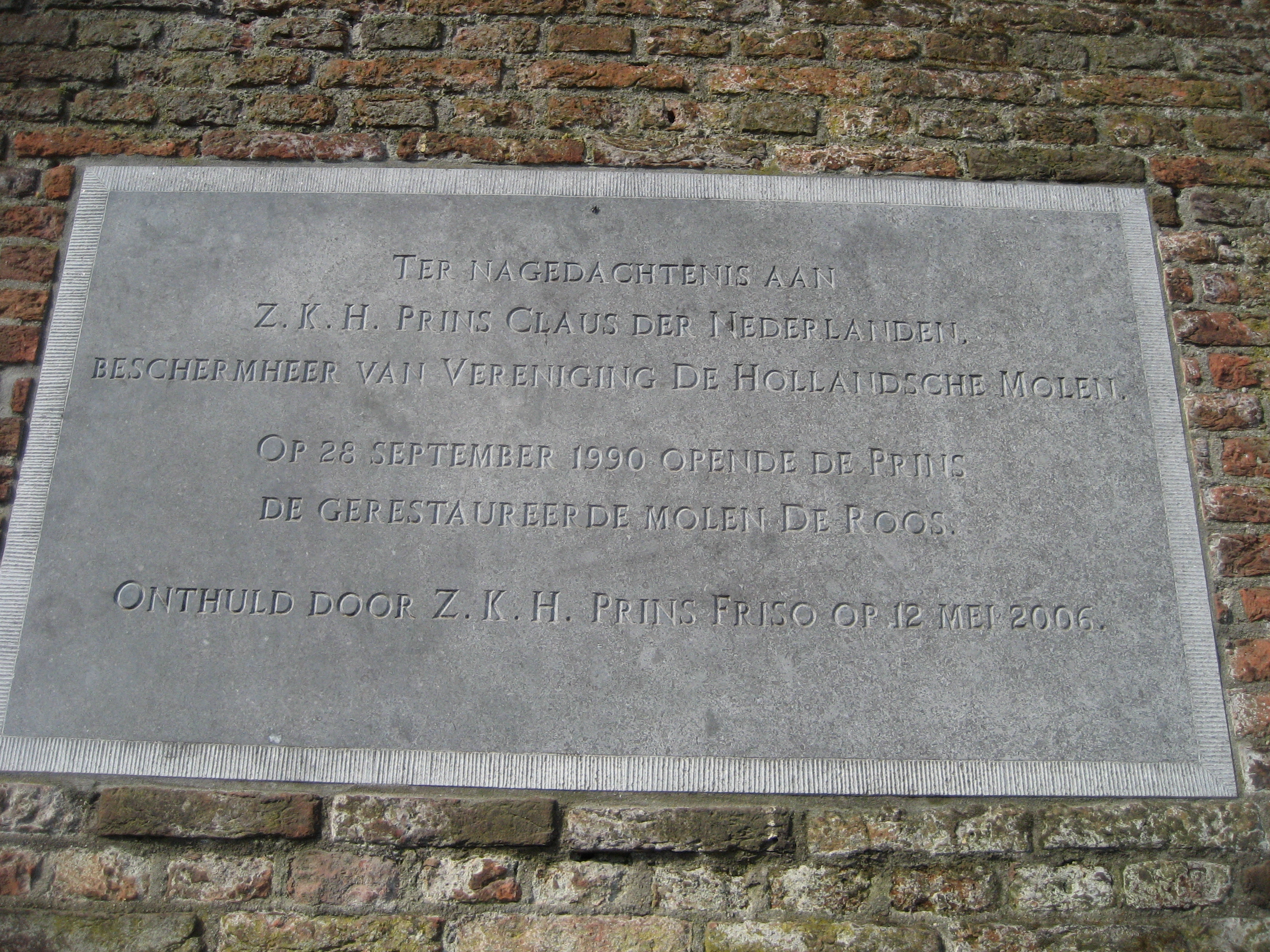
Commemorative plaque masoned into the hexagonal superstructure of the mill skirt.

The skirt of the mill is conical in shape. From its base to the level of the gallery, the structure is composed of stone blocks faced with bricks and exhibits a hexagonal shape. From the platform to the cap, the skirt has a circular shape, and its structure, of the composite type, consists of a double row of purple-red bricks joined with mortar 54 cm thick. Arched windows illuminate the structure. The mortar used to bind the bricks is quite watertight, with a moisture absorption index of 43.3 g/dm²/minute on the outer side and 21.7 g/dm²/minute on the inner side. The first floor still bears evidence of repair work carried out following the subsidence of the structure. A commemorative plaque, erected to mark the inauguration of the mill by Prince Claus von Amsberg in 1990, was unveiled by Prince Friso van Oranje-Nassau van Amsberg during the National Mills Day celebrations in May 2006. This plaque is located on one side of the skirt.

The windmill's wheel has a diameter of 25.35 meters. The sails covering the two pairs of wings, which are composed of four 10-meter-long canvas sheets spaced 1.5 meters around the hub of the main shaft, are supported by a frame of welded steel bars that extend over 25 meters in length. The two metal rods, designated as 646 and 647, were designed by the firm Derckx and constituted a replacement for the shafts 88 and 89, manufactured by the firm Bremer Adorp in 1964.

The mill has an average annual capacity of approximately 30,000 kg, or more than a ton per week, to transform cereals—including wheat, spelled, and rye—and hops into flour. As detailed in the 2019 activity report, the total quantity of grains milled into flour was 37,600 kg, comprising 33,500 kg of wheat, 2,650 kg of spelled, and 1,450 kg of rye. In the same year, the mill's wings completed 384,988 rotations, representing an increase from the 350,809 rotations recorded in 2017. These rotations were spread over 124 days, with 118 days dedicated to grinding operations, resulting in 242 active days.

==== Mechanism ====
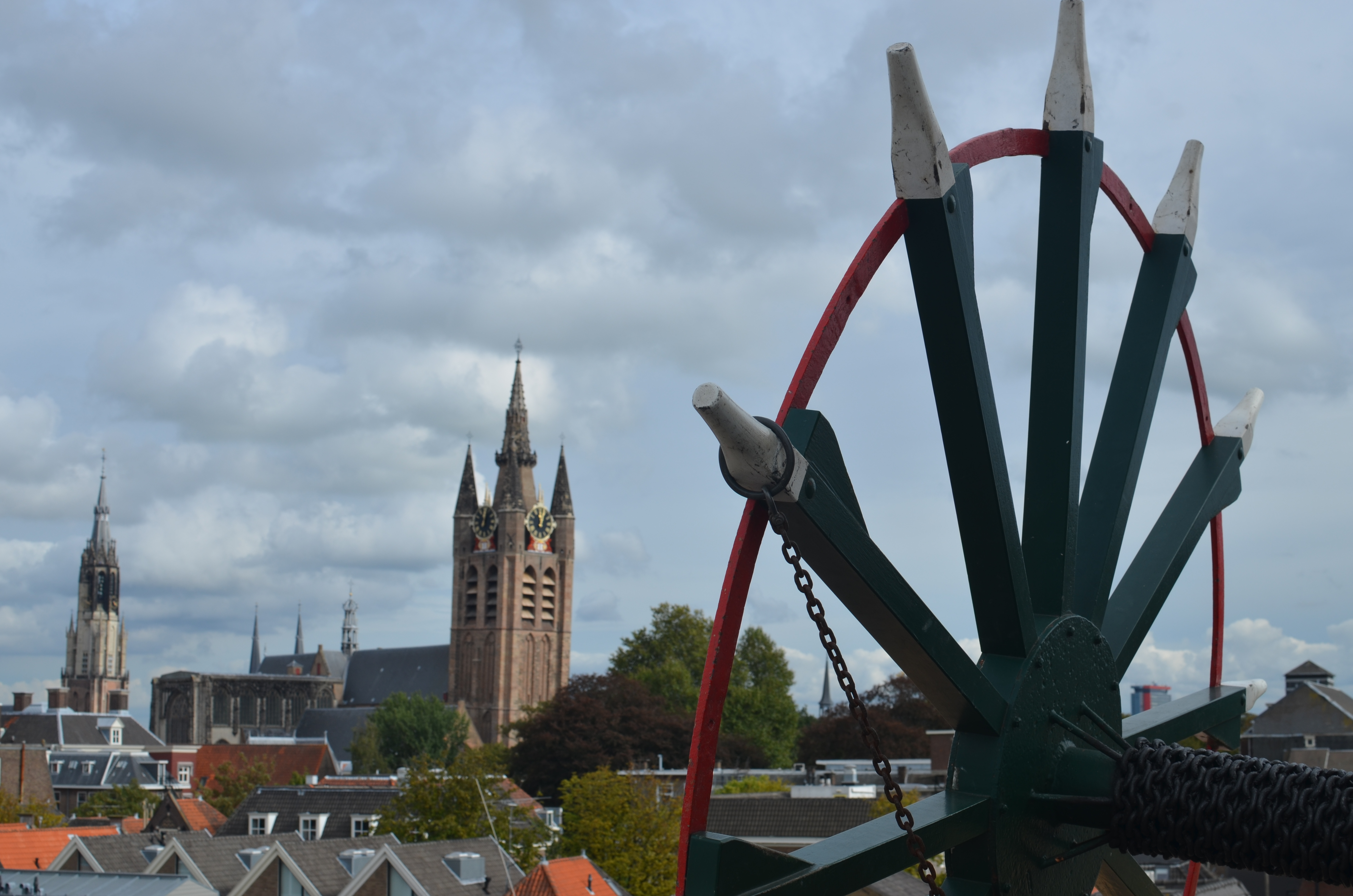
Manual regulation system for the rotating cap (end of the tail at mill gallery level).

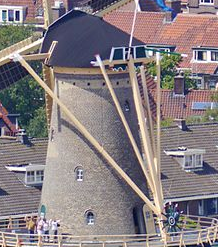
Rear view of the mill with the tail attached to the rotating cap.

The orientation of the wings facing the wind is enabled by a rotating cap, whose circular movement is achieved through 48 cast-iron rollers attached to a wooden wheel. This mechanism enables the cap to rotate in a circular motion, allowing the wings to be oriented in a direction parallel to the wind. The total mass of the cap is 16 tons, with 3.5 tons attributable to the wheel and 1.5 tons to the frame. At the posterior aspect of the cap, in opposition to the wheel, the tail (or stock), a 15-meter-long triangular structure composed of three substantial wooden beams culminating in a wheel connected to a metallic chain, enables the miller, from the platform, to manually control and regulate the rotation of the cap and the orientation of the wings facing the wind.

The windshaft, which serves as the axis around which the wings rotate, was designed by LI Enthoven & Co. in 1847. It is composed of cast iron and has a length of 5.55 meters. One of the shaft collars bears the inscription "DE OTTER." The marble beam of the cap (or yoke, a large wooden beam resting on the wheel timbers and supporting the upper shaft) measures 50 cm in height and 45 cm in width. The shaft is encircled by a gear measuring 1.6 m in diameter.

The rotation of the wings drives the grinding system, which consists of two vertical millstones made of blue volcanic stone. These stones have a diameter of approximately 150 centimeters and are characterized by arc-shaped grooves with a radius. The grinding apparatus comprises a central aperture of approximately 105 cm, a diameter of 10 to 12 cm, a thickness of 10 cm, and a gear ratio of 1:3 on the horizontal millstone. Additionally, a second pair of millstones, also measuring 17 degrees, is driven by the movement of the wings.

To compensate for the inherent variability of wind energy, which represents the primary driving force behind the mill's operation, De Roos is equipped with an electric motor with a power output of 20 horsepower, designed by the firm Heemaf. The motorized component of the rotation system comprises two hammer mills, each with a power output of 25 horsepower, and an electric sack hoist. Two gear and ball winches, situated at the hexagonal platform level, regulate the operation of the sack hoist. The flour production system is completed by a grain elevator, a 2.9-meter-high hopper, and a tank, which serves as a silo for grains passing through the second floor.

The transmission system, comprising a vertical shaft traversing the last four floors at its center, serves as its primary structural component. This system also incorporates a substantial upper wheel. The wheel, with a radius of 48 cm, is mortised with 72 cogs, each with a 12 cm pitch. A counter is provided to record the number of rotations made by the wings. The large wheel drives the spindle, which is mortised with 33 cogs measuring a pitch of 12 cm. The large lower wheel (spoorwiel), with a diameter of 80 cm, is located on the third floor, adjacent to the large upper wheel, on the central rotation axis of the mill. It is mortised with 80 cogs, each with a pitch of 8.5 cm long. Two additional lanterns, mortised with 24 cogs with a pitch of 8.5 cm, are driven on either side of its axis. The gear ratio of the large upper wheel with the upper lantern is 1/6.46, while that of the large lower wheel coupled to the two lower lanterns is 1/7.27.

=== Miller's house and warehouse ===
The edifice intended for the miller and the adjoining warehouse is constructed from cut volcanic tuff blocks joined with lime. The height of the house to its ridge is 9.2 meters, comprising a ground floor topped by two stories. Each of its two facades is equipped with a "spout" gable, while the warehouse facade features a "bell" gable.

The main block of the house is extended by a wing covered by a shed roof, situated opposite the shared wall with the mill's skirt. The facade of the main house rises to approximately 9 meters in height, with the wall shared with the mill's skirt reaching a height of 6 meters.

The property has been subdivided to accommodate a variety of functions. The ground floor has been converted into a workshop, a conference and a meeting room, and a party hall. A shop selling local products (including mustard made with beer remnants) and a dining area are also located within the house premises. Finally, three rooms in the house, each occupying an area of about 16 m², have been converted into guest rooms.

Miller's house and adjacent warehouse

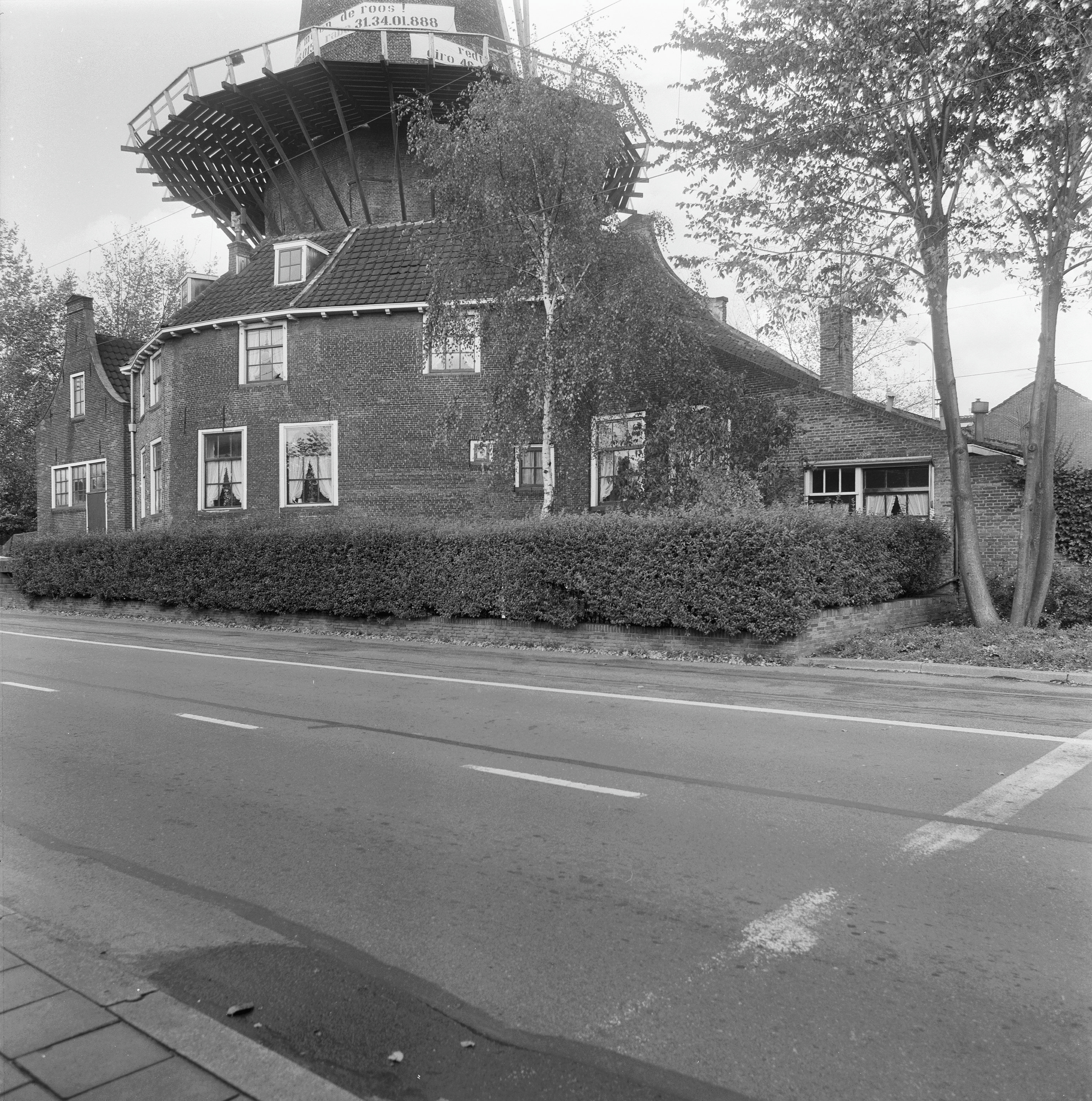
Facade of the miller's dwelling and warehouse.

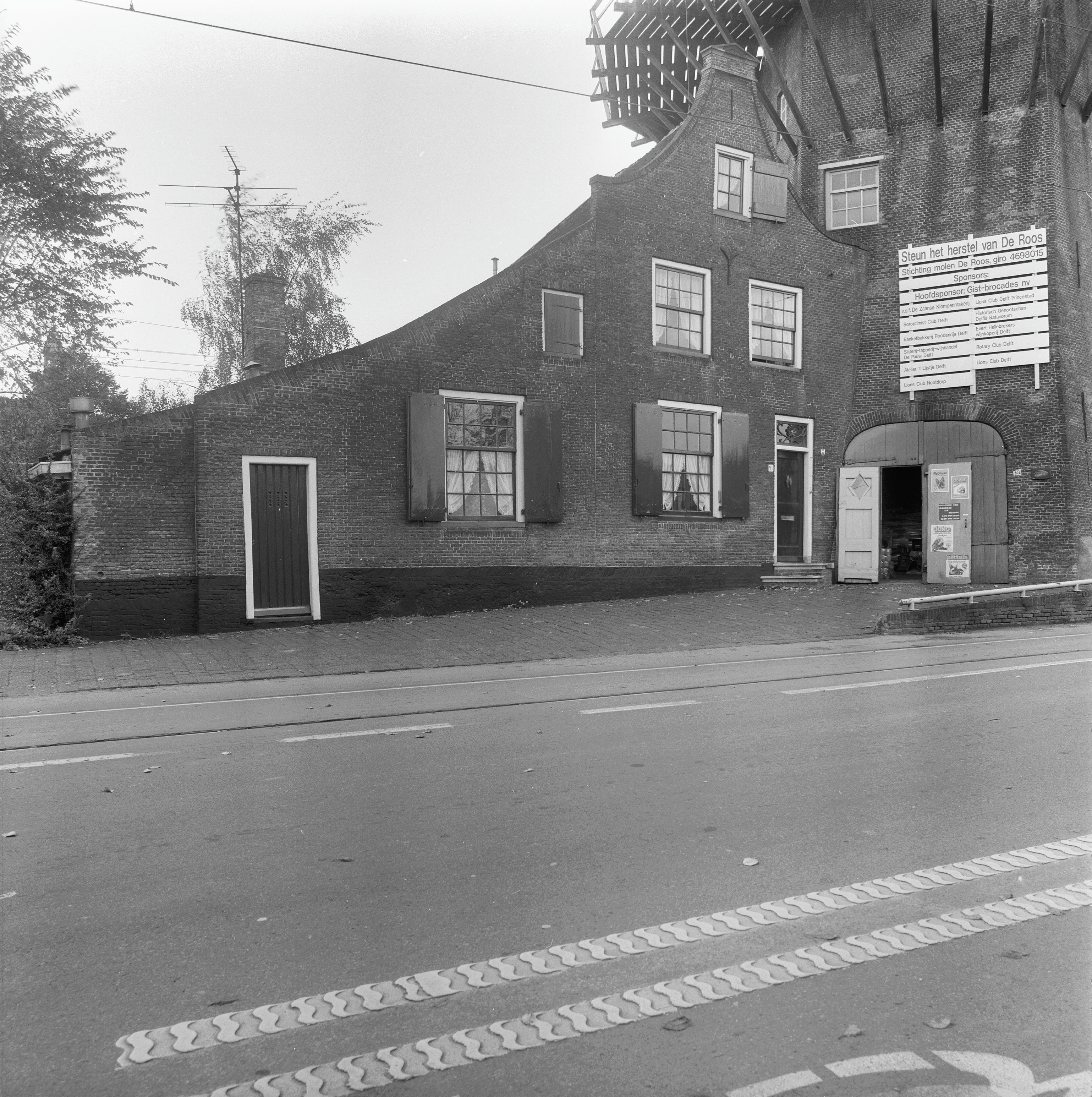
Logis.

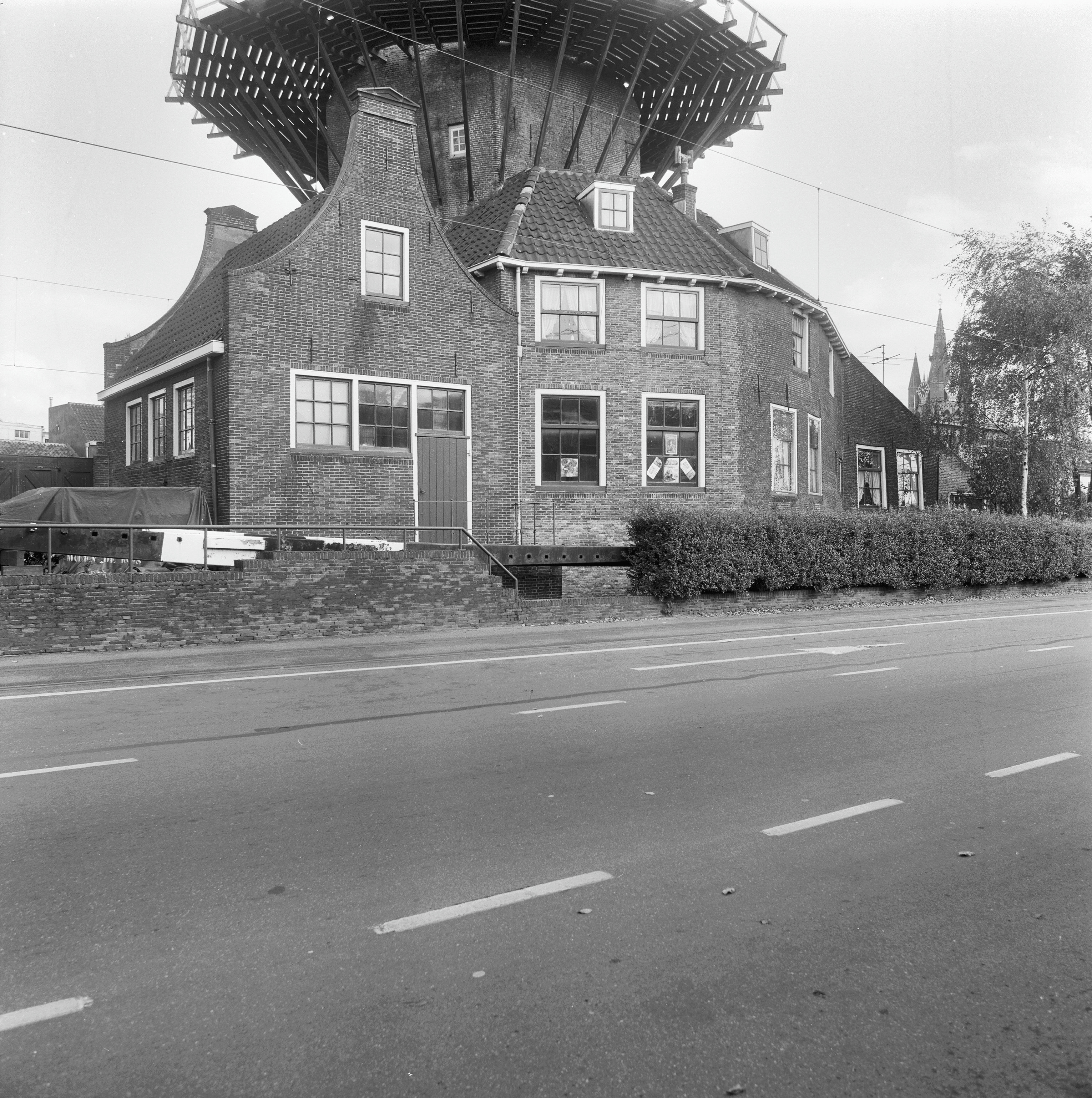
Warehouse and dwelling.

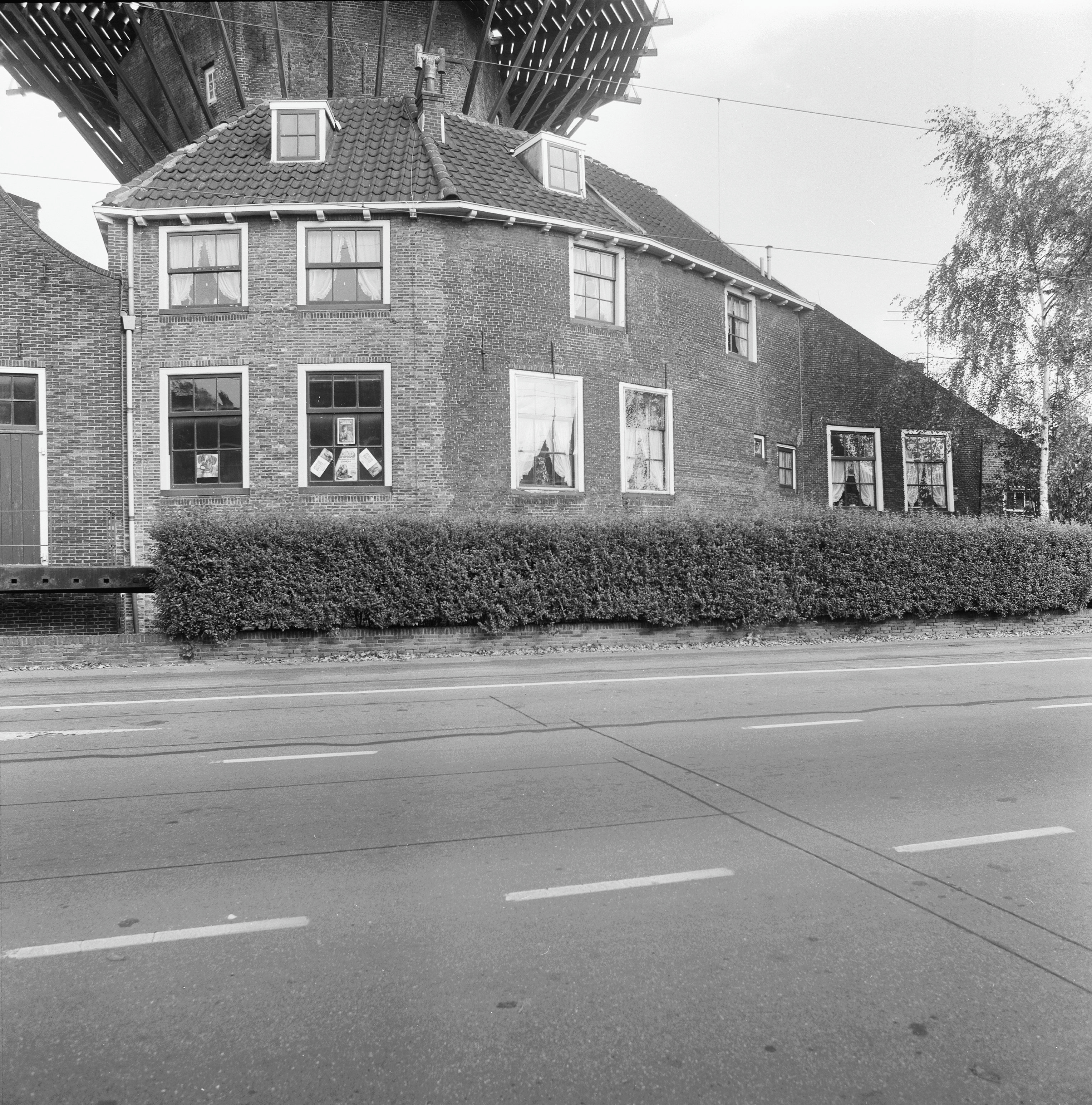
Logis.

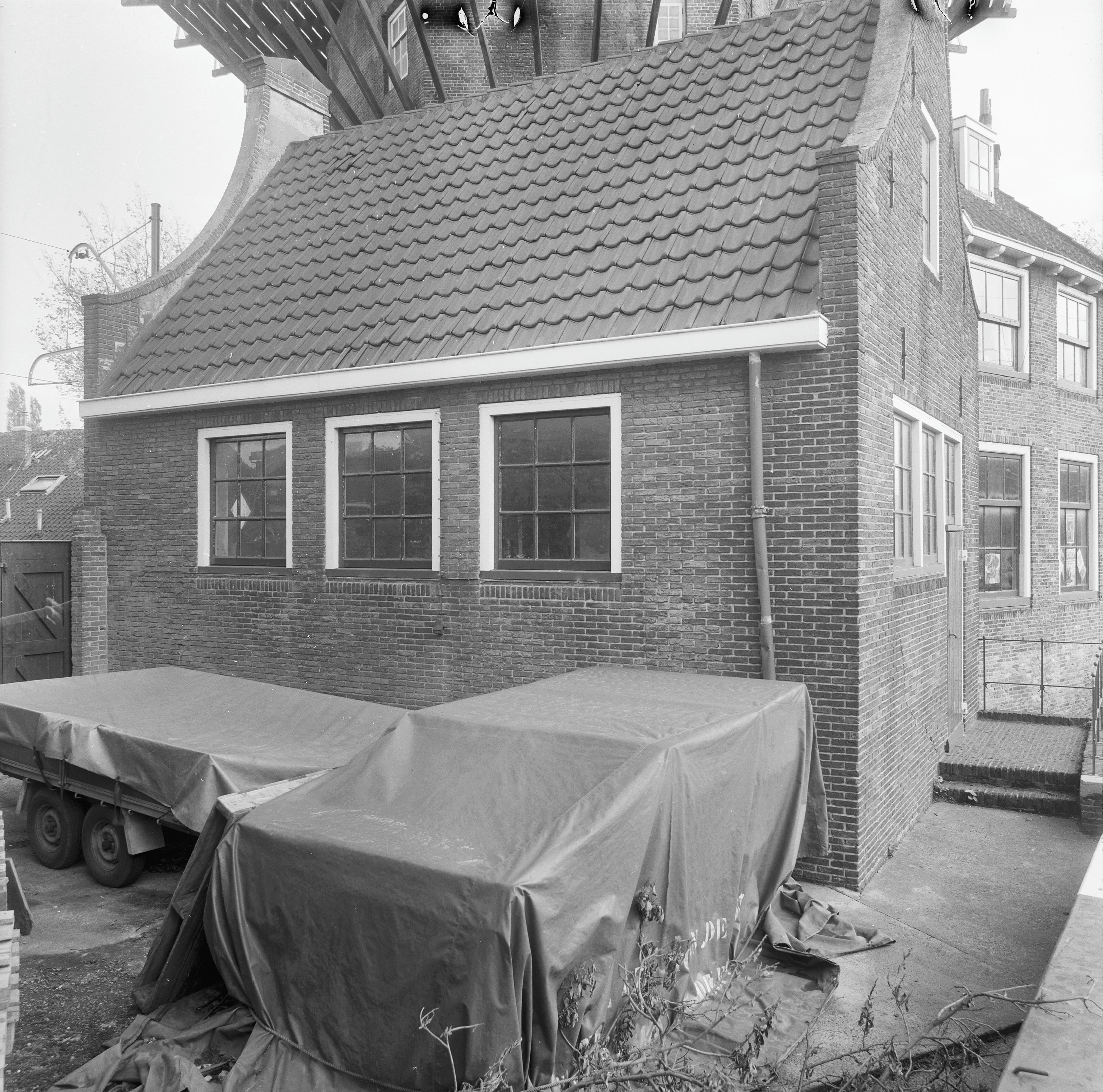
Warehouse.

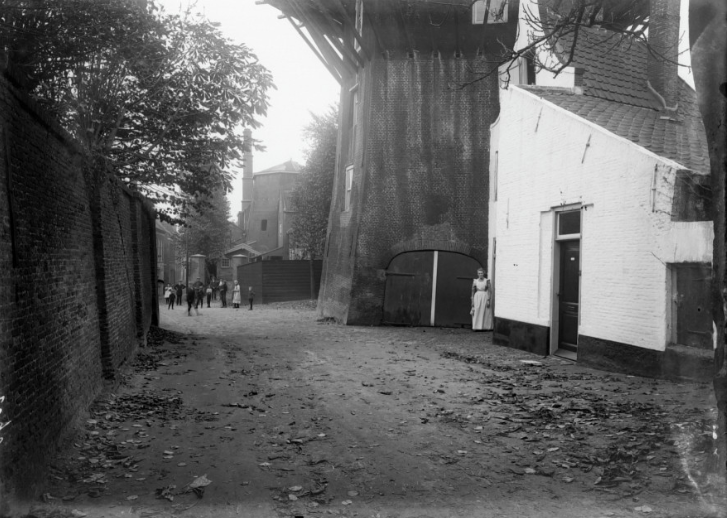
The miller's dwelling adjoins the mill.

== See also ==
- List of windmills in South Holland

== Bibliography ==
- Bakker, J. S (2012). "De Roos omhoog" (PDF). Molen Wereld (in Dutch). 5 (162): 308–309. Archived from the original on June 23, 2023.
- Kouwenhoven, G (2006). "Molen De Roos te Delft kan op huidige plek blijven staan" (PDF). Molen Wereld (in Dutch). 9 (90).
- Lansbergen, Gab (2010). "Kroniek over 2010" (PDF). Delfia Batavorum (in Dutch): 32. Archived from the original (PDF) on August 8, 2022.
- Songma, S. H (2010). "Molen De Roos" (PDF). Delfia Batavorum (in Dutch): 163–165. Archived from the original (PDF) on August 8, 2022.
- "Dubbel Delft". Delft Op Zondag (in Dutch). 2019. Archived from the original on June 1, 2023.
- Synnergren, Sara (2020). "Molen De Roos Delft". Reuse to remember - Rememember to reuse : How architectural heritage can make the countryside more attractive (PDF). Gothenburg: Chalmers School of Architecture. p. 127.
- Bergman, A. M (2004). "Kroniek over 2004" (PDF). Delfia Batavorum (in Dutch): 42.
- Broekhoven, Sabine; van Ginkel-Meester, Saskia; Kolman, Chris (2004). "windmolen de Roos". Reuse to remember - Rememember to reuse : How architectural heritage can make the countryside more attractive (in Dutch). Waanders Uitgevers. p. 133. Archived from the original on July 2, 2024.
- Janssen, Johanes (2013). "Van stadswal naar tunneldak, de geschiedenis van molen De Roos". Mededelingenblad (in Dutch). 22 (4): 1961–1962.
- "Molen de Roos weer terug naar eigenaar" (PDF). Molen Wereld (in Dutch). 16 (174). 2013. Archived from the original on October 16, 2024.
- Struijk, Aart (2013). Van stadswal naar tunneldak. De geschiedenis van molen De Roos in Delft (in Dutch). Département d'archéologie de la ville de Delft. Archived from the original on July 20, 2024.
- "Phoenixstraat 52 over de stadswal". Achter de gevels van Delft (PDF) (in Dutch). Delfia Batavorum. 2009. Archived from the original on June 5, 2023.
- Otten, O. E; Mulders, R. J. W. M (2020). "Molen De Roos te Delft : Invloed bebouwingshoogte Bacinol op windvang mol" (PDF). Rapport de la société d'ingénieurs consultants Peutz (in Dutch) (16417-1-RA-001). Archived from the original on July 15, 2024.
- Bosma, E; van der Burg, H. J; Pfeiffer, Edvard (1980). "Delft - De Roos". De molens van Zuid-Holland (in Dutch). Provinciaal Bestuur van Zuid-Holland.
- Bicker Caarten, A; van der Burg, H. J (1965). "Inventarisnummer : 95 - Delft - De Roos". Zuid-Hollands molenboek (in Dutch) (2nd ed.). N. Samsom.
- Groetend, J (1965). "Molen "De Roos" te Delft" [nl]. De Molenaar. 22 (12).
- Rédaction du Delftsche Courant (1979). "Hei molentje, molentje..." [nl]. Delftsche Courant.
- Hermans, Annelies (1996). "In Delft stonden molens bij de vleet" [nl]. Delftsche Courant.
- Spaander, I. V. T.; Leeuw, R. A (1984). "Molens binnen de delftse veste". De Stad Delft : verschenen bij de tentoonstelling "De Stad Delft" in het Stedelijk Museum "Het Prinsenhof" (15 december 1979 t/m 17 februari 1980; 21 maart t/m 24 mei 1981; 18 december 1982 t/m 27 februari 1983) (in Dutch). Museum Het Prinsenhof. Archived from the original on July 16, 2024.
- Visser, C (1928). "De Roos te Delft". Onze Hollandsche Molens : Bijdragen tot de kennis en de geschiedenis van de windmolens in Nederland (in Dutch). De Spieghel. Archived from the original on January 22, 2025.
- van Gerven, Ed (2009). "Bowhistorisch onderzoek in kader van tunnelaanleg wijst uit : Broze De Roos bijkt uniek te zijn". Molens (in Dutch).
