= Legal act =

Legal act may refer to:

- Legal transaction, means by which legal subjects can change the legal positions of themselves or other persons intentionally
- Legislative act, e.g. an act of Parliament or act of Congress, a formal written enactment produced by a legislature
- a legal document, regulation, part of law.

== See also ==
- Legal action
