= Windshaft =

Part of a windmill

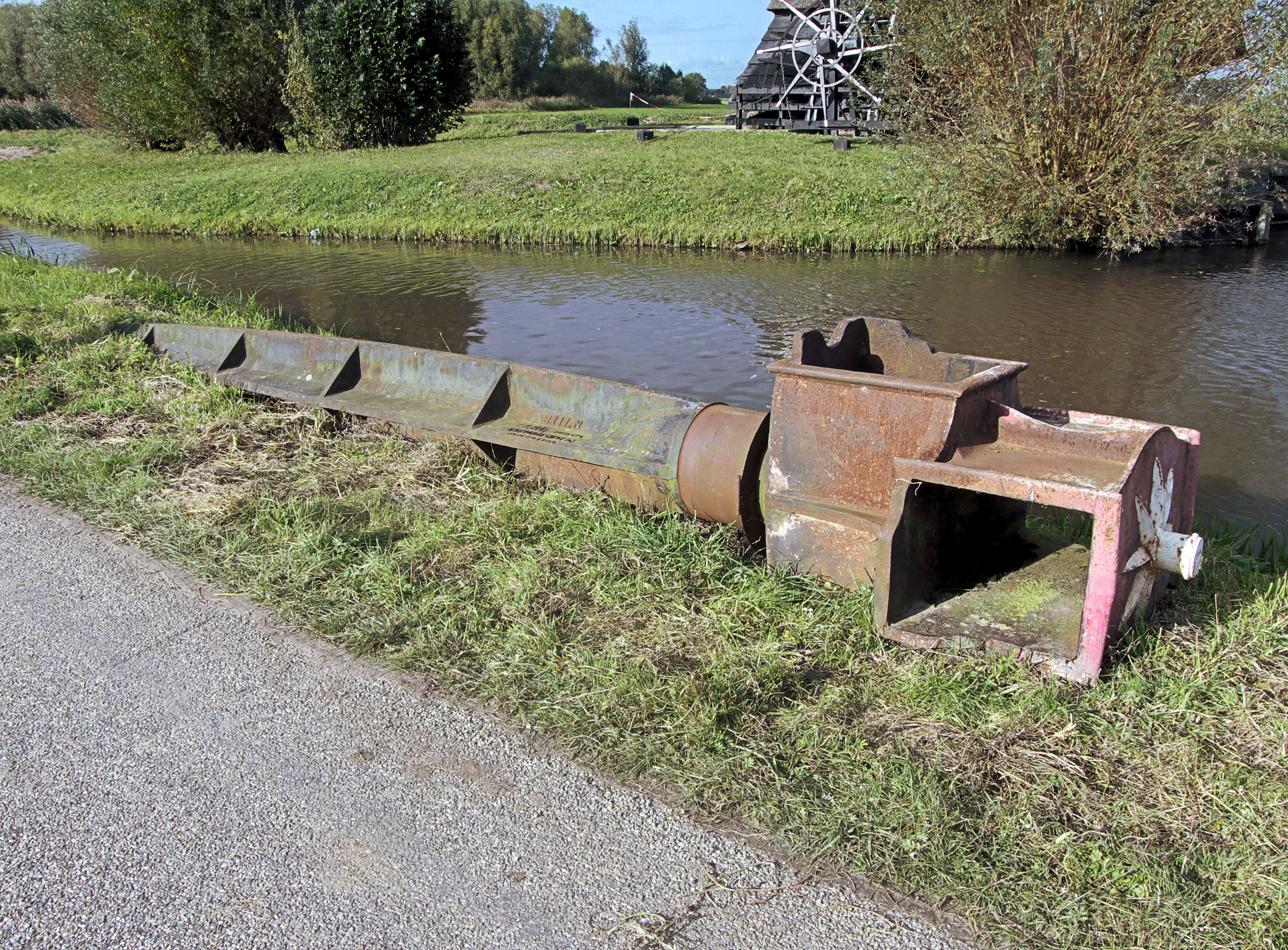
A windshaft lying near a mill

Hook Windmill, North Main Street at Pantigo Road, East Hampton, Suffolk County, NY HAER NY,52-HAMTE,2- (sheet 6 of 6)

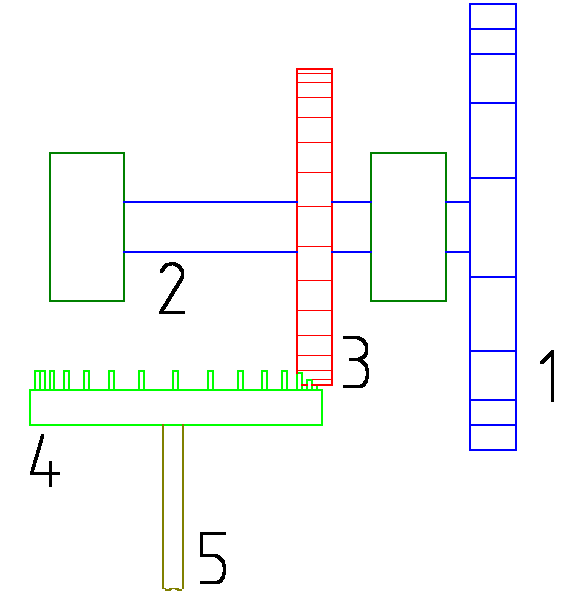
Windshaft connected to other parts. 1=sails; 2=windshaft; 3=brake wheel, 4=crown wheel with cogs; 5=vertical or main shaft.

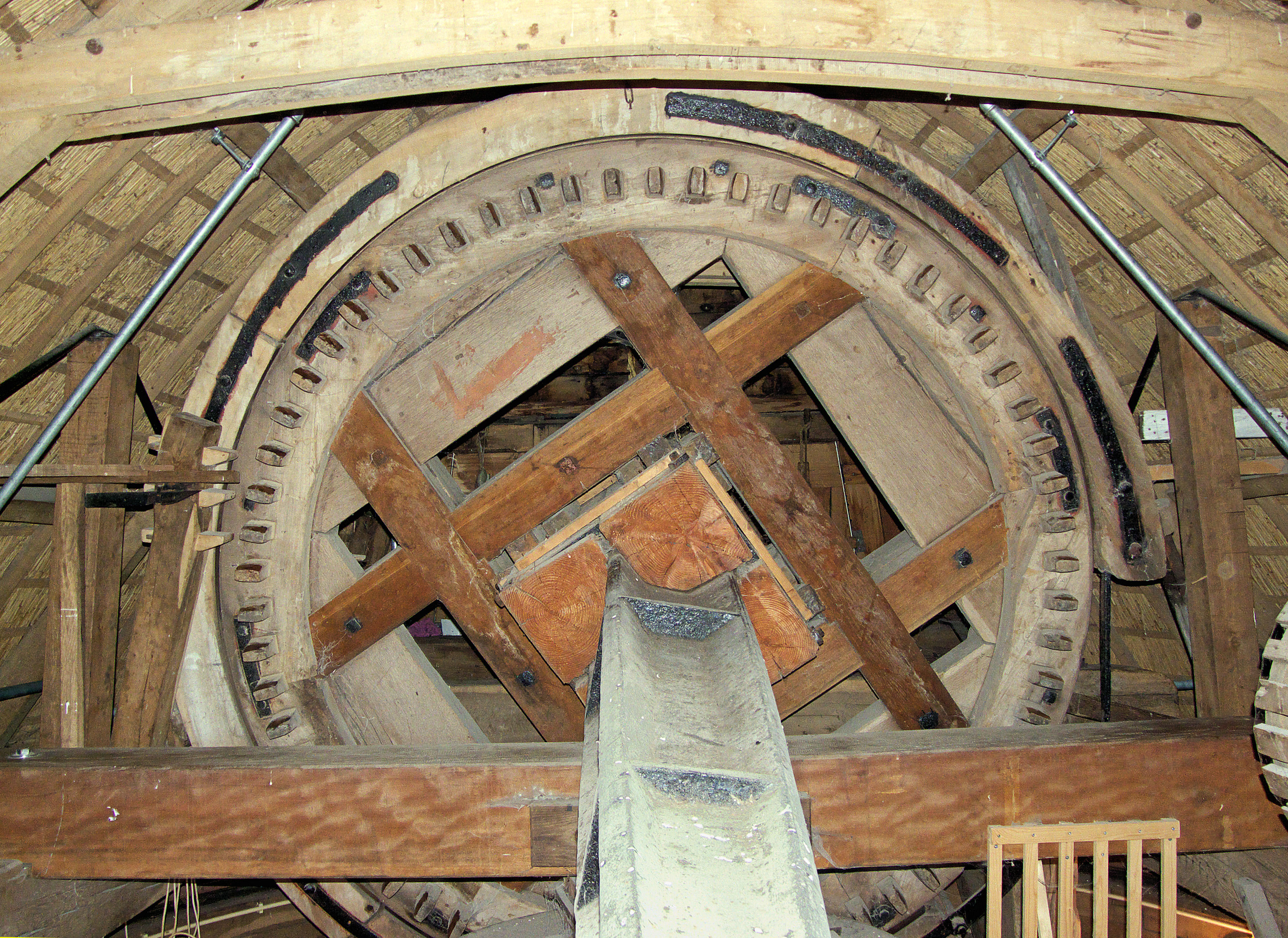
brake wheel

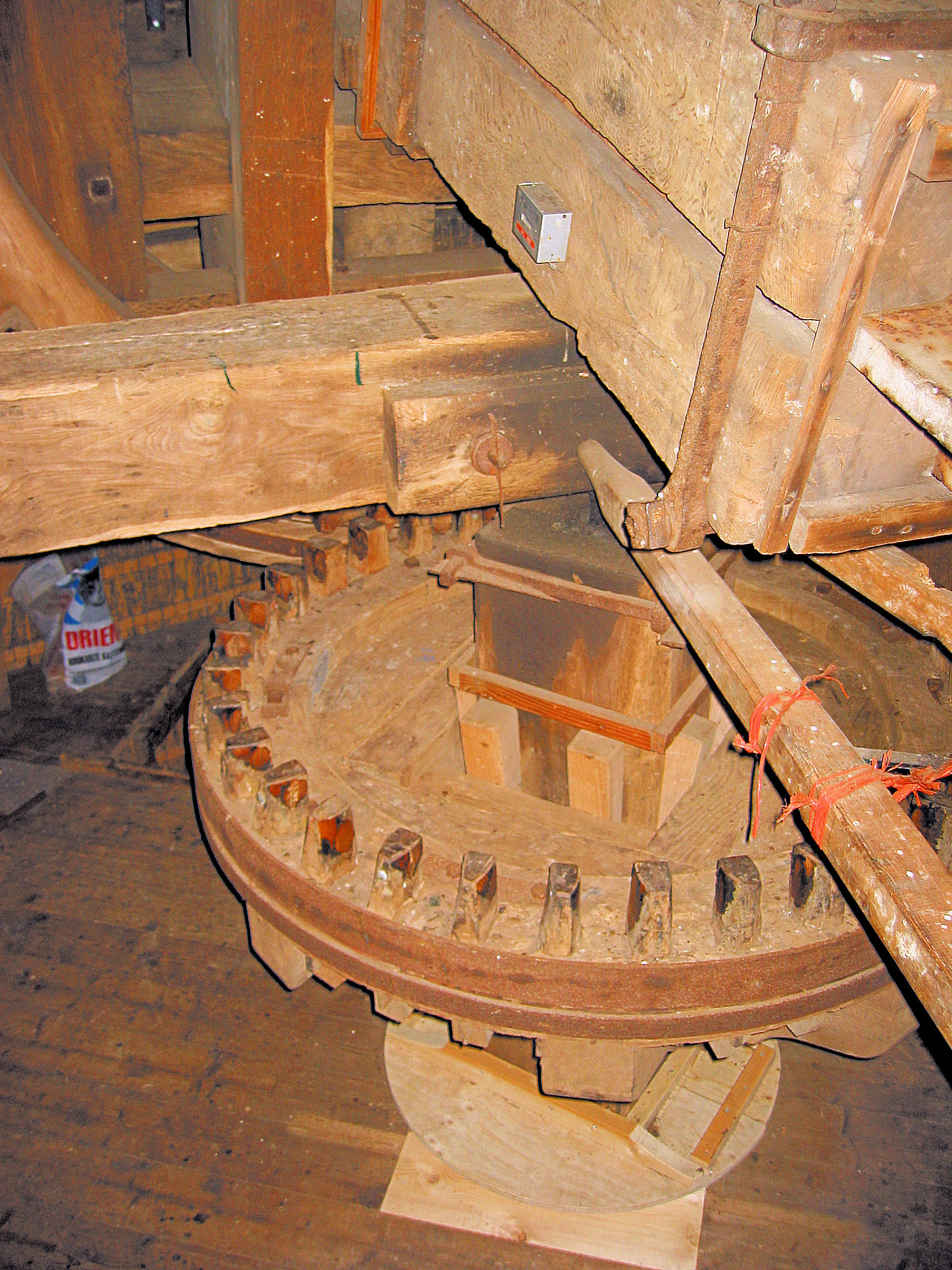
crown wheel with cogs and windshaft

The Windshaft is a part in a windmill that carries the sails and also the brake wheel (Smock and Tower mills, and in some Post mills) or the head wheel and tail wheel in a Post Mill. Windshafts can be wholly made of wood, or wood with a cast iron poll end (upon where the sails are mounted) or entirely of cast iron.
