= Legal transaction =

A legal transaction or transactional act (German: Rechtsgeschäft, literally ‘legal business’; Latin: negotium juridicum), under German jurisprudence, is the main type of lawful legal act (also known as an act-in-the-law, act at law, or juridical act) ‘by which legal subjects can change the legal positions of themselves or other persons intentionally’. The concept is important in civil law jurisdictions based on or influenced by the German law of obligations, like Austria, Switzerland, Greece, Turkey, South Korea, and Japan. It also makes its appearance in a few Napoleonic jurisdictions that have partially received German legal theory, like Italy or Portugal.

The concept is a product of German jurisprudence and was developed as an alternative to the French-based dualism between legal fact vs. legal act. German legal theory rejects the notion of the legal fact (juristische Tatsache, Rechtstatsache, Latin factum iuridicum); thus, there is only the legal act (Rechtshandlung, Latin actus iuridicus), which is divided into lawful and unlawful legal acts. Of the three types of lawful acts (i.e. transactional, quasi-transactional, and de facto acts), the transactional act is the main category.

A transactional act is any voluntary manifestation of intention that creates the legal effects that the actor(s) specifically intended to bring about. Transactional acts include most of the unilateral and multilateral acts that are contemplated by the law. The main types are:

- Verpflichtungsgeschäft - constitutive transaction, i.e. any act that creates (or ‘constitutes’) an obligation
  - examples: contract, gift, agency (actual authority), will, marriage, adoption, etc.
- Verfügungsgeschäft - dispositive transaction, i.e. any act that either transfers or extinguishes (or ‘disposes of’) an obligation
  - examples: conveyance, assignment, delivery (of a movable), encumbrance, debt release or cancellation
- Gestaltungsgeschäft - potestative transaction, i.e. any unilateral act that creates a new potestative right (Gestaltungsrecht), or modifies and/or abolishes an existing legal relationship
  - examples: rescission, will contest, giving notice (of quitting a job), letting a statute of limitations run out, abandonment (of property, etc.)

A transactional act can be distinguished from the other lawful legal acts, i.e. the quasi-transactional act (rechtsgeschäftsähnliche Handlung) and the de facto act (Realakt). The quasi-transactional act, though voluntary and intended, brings about legal effects that are not necessarily intended or sought out. The most obvious examples are quasi-contracts such as unjust enrichment, negotiorum gestio, and indebiti solutio, as well as acknowledgments, depositions, and the carrying out of a fiduciary duty. A de facto act is involuntary and lacks any overt intentionality; instead it comes about by accident (i.e. force majeure) or is construed from the circumstances (even when they contradict an actor's express will). Some examples of the latter include a constructive trust, partnership by estoppel, and agency under apparent authority.
