= Westelijke Eilanden =

- Neighborhood of Amsterdam
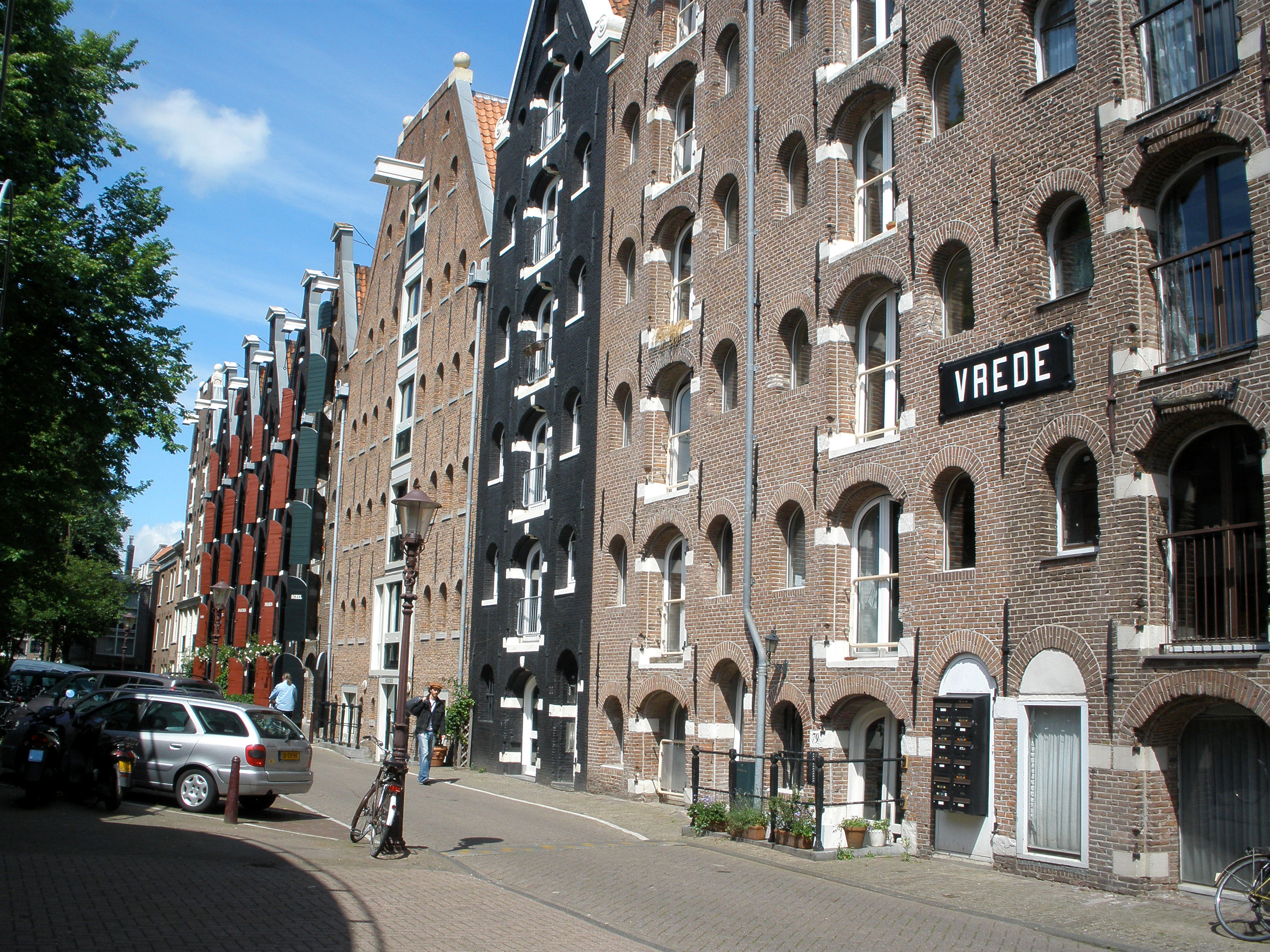
- Former warehouses on Prinseneiland

- Location within Amsterdam
- Country: Netherlands
- Province: North Holland
- COROP: Amsterdam
- Borough: Amsterdam-Centrum
- Established: 1611–15

Area
  - Land: 0.22 km^{2} (0.085 sq mi)

Population (2017)
  - Total: 2,900
- Time zone: UTC+1 (CET)
- Postcode: 1013

Westelijke Eilanden (Dutch pronunciation: [ˌʋɛstələkə ˈʔɛilɑndə(n)]; "Western Islands") are three islands in the Centrum district of Amsterdam: Bickerseiland, Prinseneiland and Realeneiland. They are located to the south of the IJ and the Zeeheldenbuurt, to the north of the railway line between Central Station and Amsterdam-Sloterdijk, to the west of the Westerdok and to the east of the Planciusbuurt on the Westerkanaal. The Westelijke Eilanden form the core of the Golden Reael area, which also includes the adjacent Westerdok island, the Haarlemmerbuurt and the Planciusbuurt.

The Westelijke Eilanden form a small world apart from the city. They are suitable for walks, which Joannes Antonides van der Goes recommended in a poem, Ystroom, as early as 1671. They are often used for filming. There have always been warehouses and shipyards on the Westelijke Eilanden. They formed an important part of the atmosphere on the islands, a combination of working and living. The islands are sometimes called the "Mokum Archipelago".

== History ==
The Nieuwe Waal was deepened in the IJ in 1610 and demarcated with rows of poles as an extension of the Port of Amsterdam. This left an area of almost floating or loose peat in the corner of the IJ, which needed to be stabilized. Between 1611 and 1615 three large artificial islands were created there, protected by a large bulwark that extended as far as the IJ. This was part of the Third Expansion - Derde Uitleg (nl) - of Amsterdam, for which the first plans date from 1610. Land speculation by a number of council members, including Frans Hendricksz. Oetgens, led to a riot in the council in 1614. If the speculators had got their way it would have led to the need for extensive buy-out of land by the city, or a reduction in income to the city.

=== Names of the islands ===
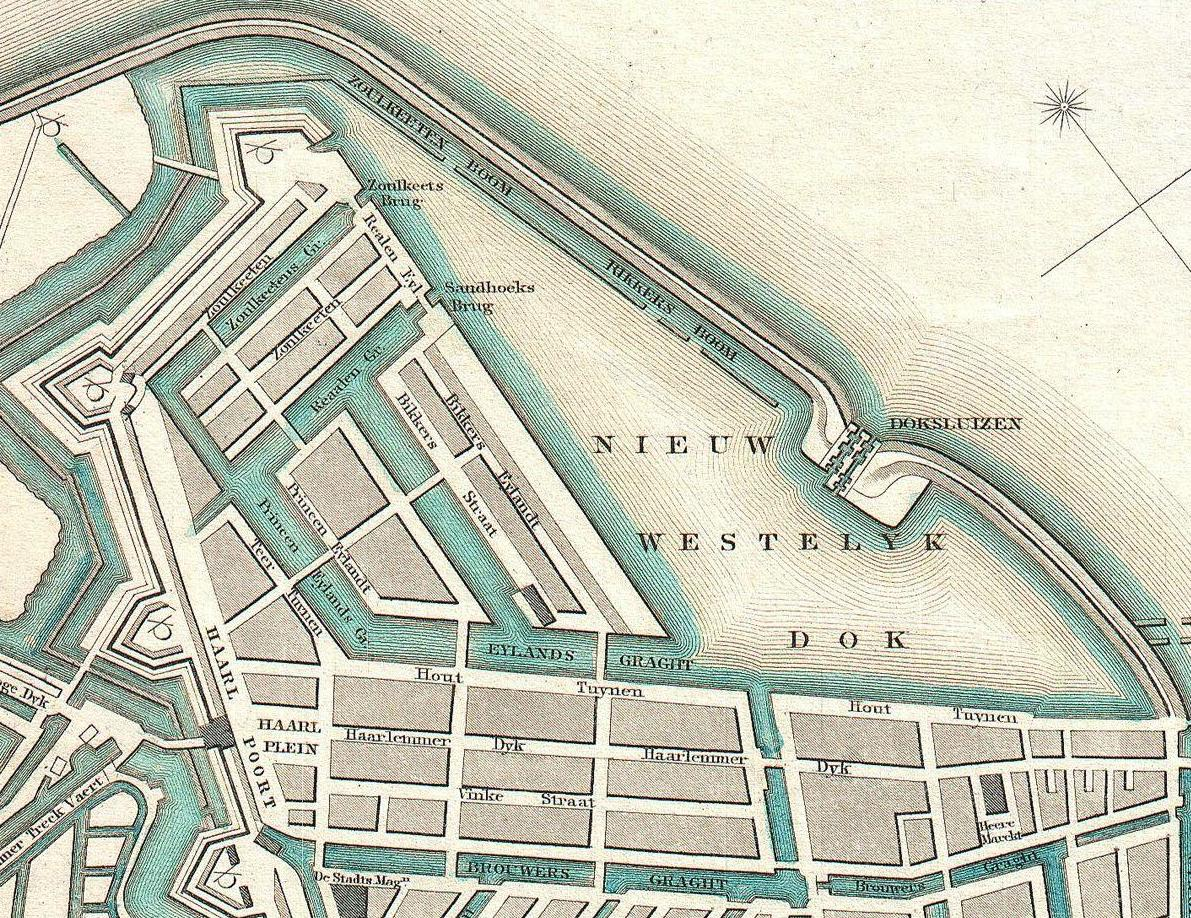
1835 S.D.U.K. city map of Amsterdam Western Dock

Initially, the three largest islands were called Vooreiland, Middeneiland and Achtereiland. They were connected by eight bridges. The Vooreiland was renamed Bickerseiland after Jan Bicker, a descendant of the Bicker merchant family who had managed the construction in the city administration. Achtereiland was for the same reason named Realeneiland after Jacob Reael. Middeneiland was named Prinseneiland after the first three Princes of Orange.

In contrast to the Eastern Islands, shipyards and warehouses on the Westelijke Eilanden were not involved with the Dutch East India Company or the Admiralty of Amsterdam, but with the Dutch West India Company and the trade in the Baltic Sea. One shipyard built pleasure boats. The warehouses stored herring, grain, tobacco, wine, salt, anchovies, cat skins, pitch and tar. The Silodam, Zoutkeetsgracht, Bokkinghangen, Nieuwe Teertuinen and Breeuwerstraten owe their names to the activities of grain storage, salt refining, fish smoking, tarring and calking.

=== Port falls into decay ===
Until the end of the 19th century this was an area with many shipyards, small industries and warehouses. On the islands and in the immediate vicinity there were also salt sheds, buckling smokehouses, and tar and tanning works where ship timbers, sails and fishing nets were preserved. Then the ships became too large for this port, and the development of the Eastern Docklands took over the role the Westelijke Eilanden had played for more than 200 years. During the first half of the 20th century, the neighborhood fell into decay. Nevertheless, much has been preserved of the atmosphere of the busy past.

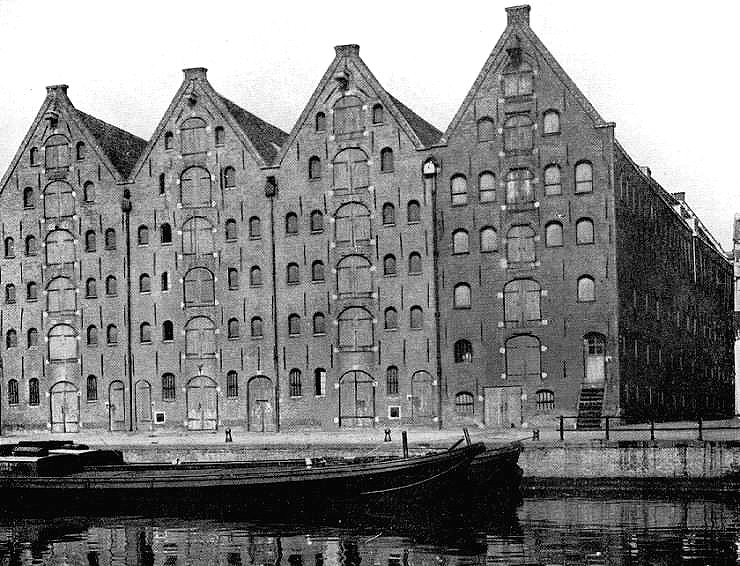
Warehouses on Realeneiland

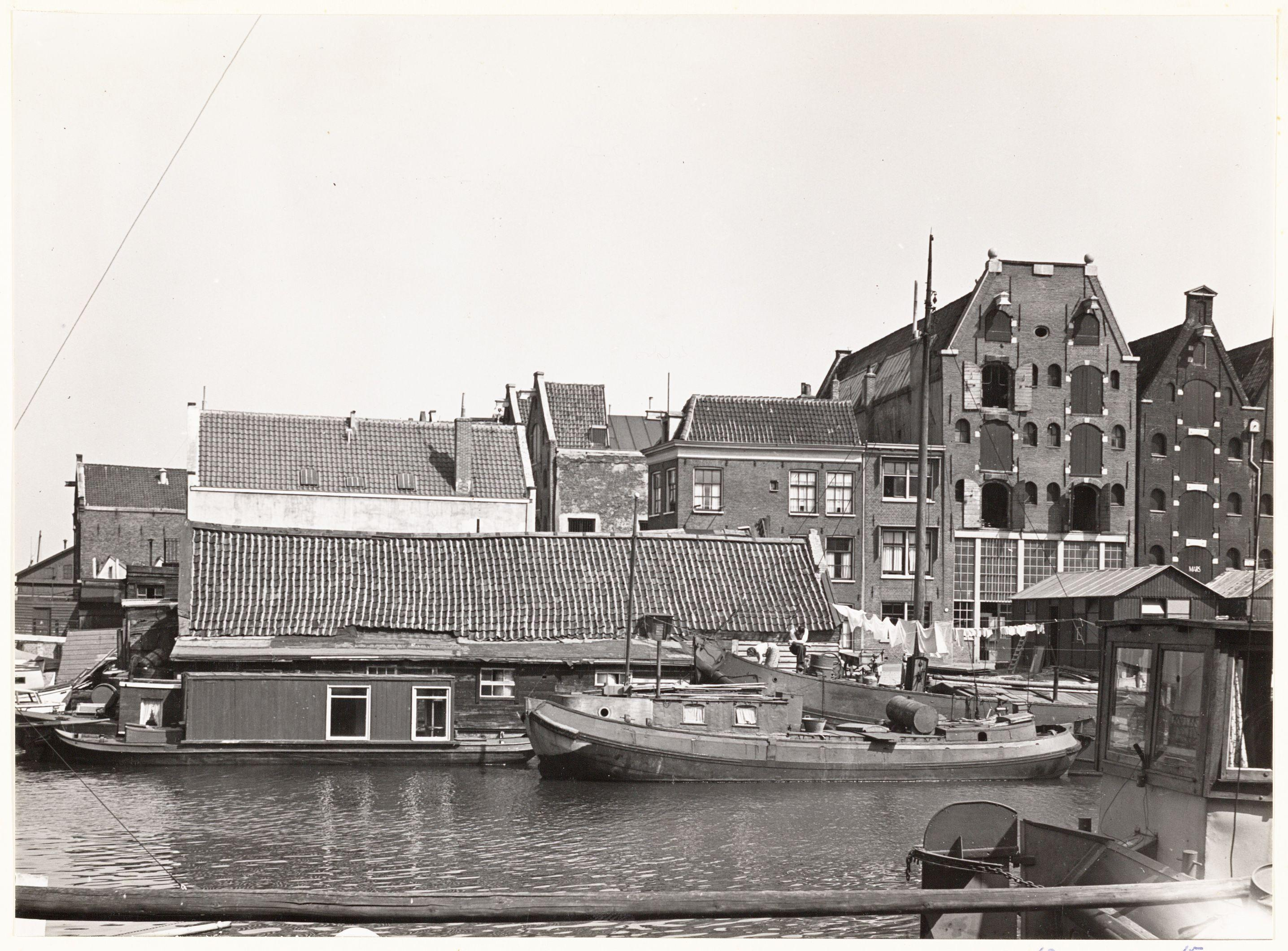
Warehouses on Prinseneiland

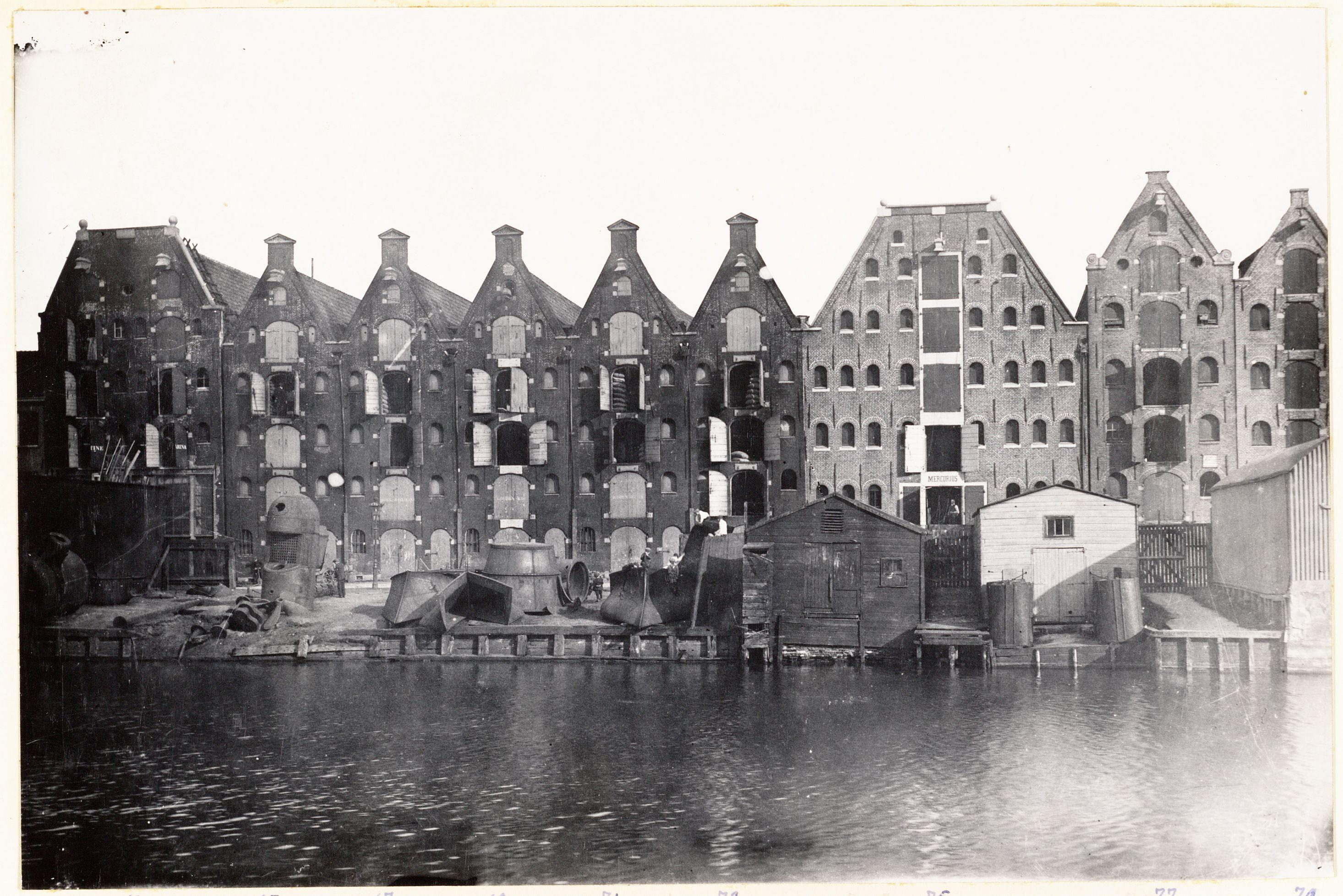
Five similar warehouses once owned by Neeltje Pater

== Bickerseiland ==
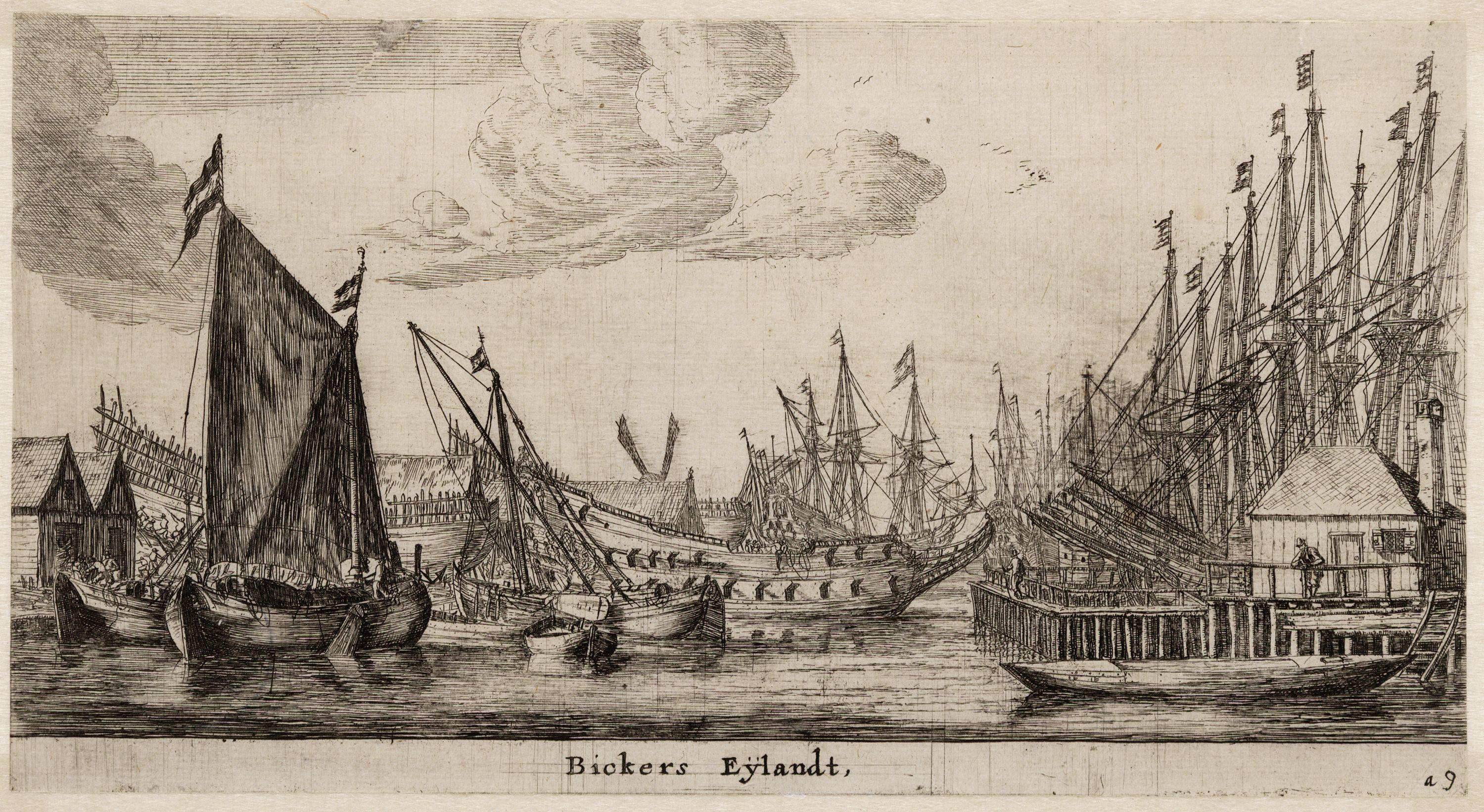
Bickerseiland by Reinier Nooms, (1623-1664)

Bickerseiland, originally the Vooreiland, was named after the Jan Bicker who invested specifically in the island which he bought from the city in 1631. He had ship wharfs, (ware)houses and a tower built so he could watch his ships building. A marina was built at an early stage. There was a three-aisled wooden church from 1660, which was replaced by a stone building around 1736. After this church was closed in 1939 and demolished in 1950, the gravestones were used for the restoration of the floor of St. Martin's Church, Bolsward. Some of the household items ended up in a restaurant on the Haarlemmerstraat.

Bickerseiland is no longer an island due to the construction of the railway embankment between Westerdok and Westerpoort (1878) for the Den Helder–Amsterdam railway.

== Prinseneiland ==
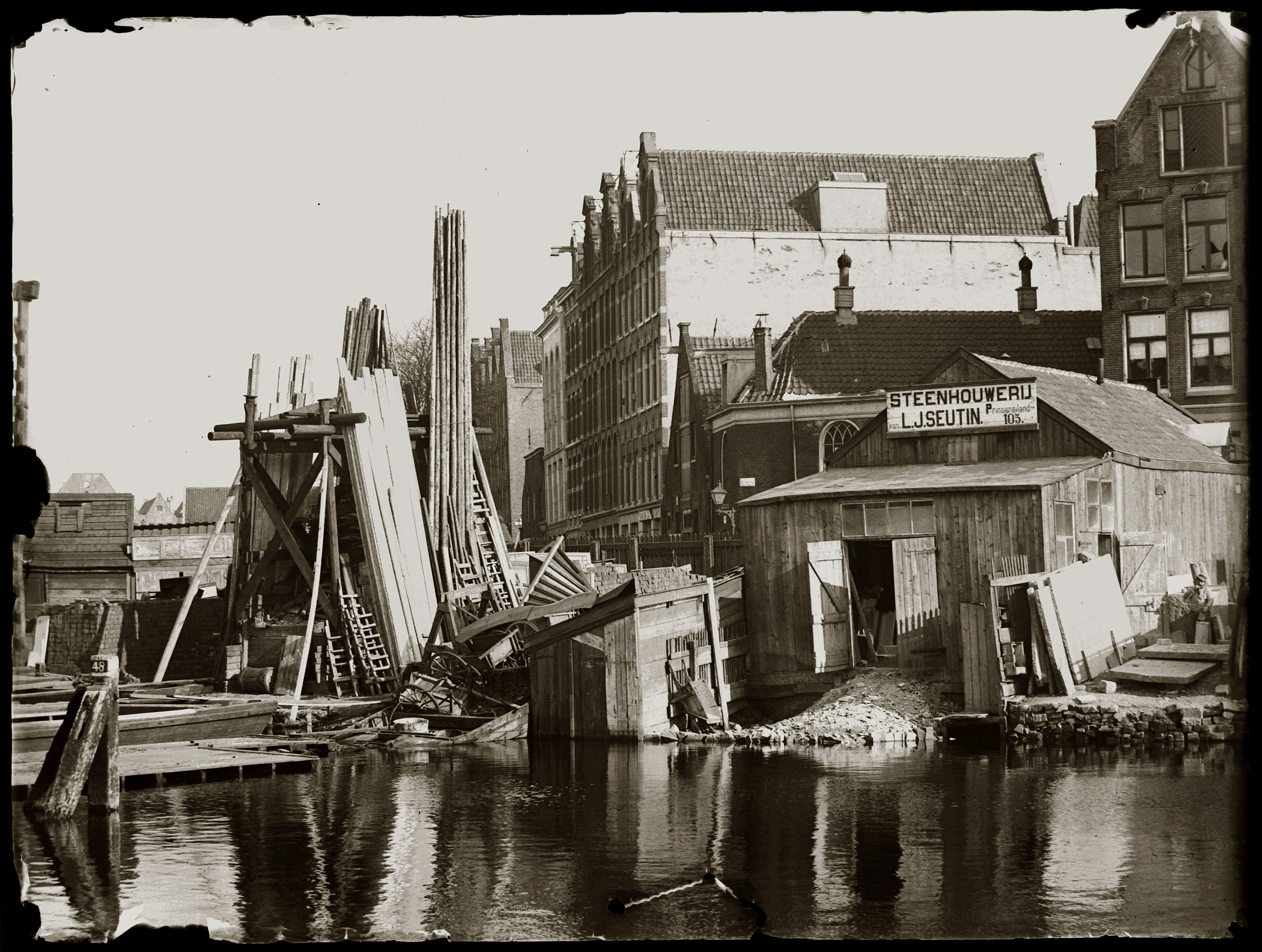
Prinseneiland 87-103 photo by Jacob Olie

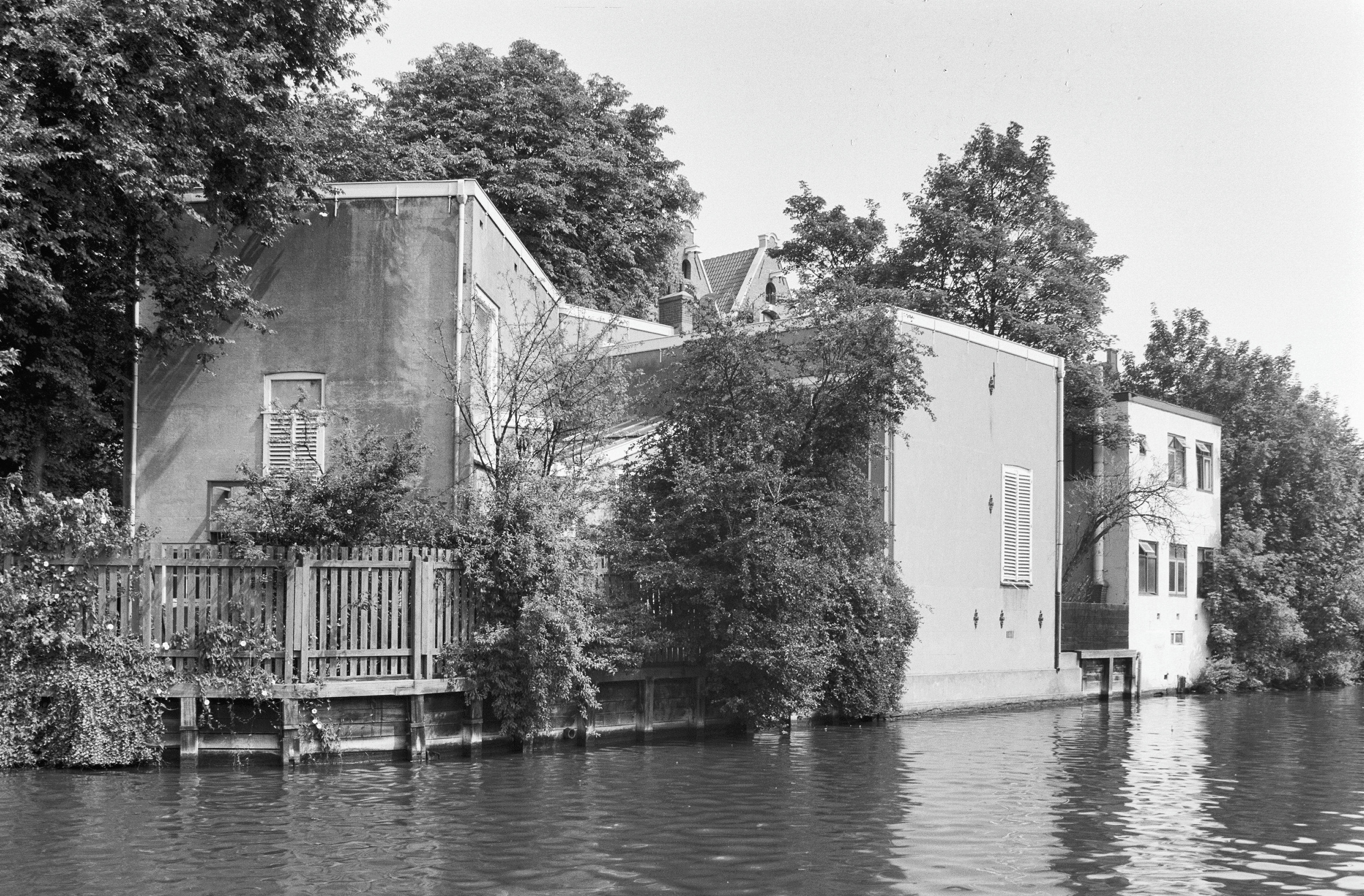
Studio of George Hendrik Breitner and Jef Diederen to the left

This island, at first called the "Middeleiland", was named after the Princes of Orange. An attempt to call the Galgenstraat the Prinsendwarsstraat never got off the ground.

After a city council conflict about speculation and taxes that lasted ten years, the sale of plots on Prinseneiland began in 1623. The island was mainly intended for wood storage and tar. Of the 900 stone warehouses in Amsterdam, more than sixty were on Prinseneiland in the middle of the 18th century. Neeltje Pater from Broek in Waterland inherited at least eleven warehouses on the island. Typical are the wooden sheds, shipyards and studios across the street.

After World War II the island was discovered by the artists Jan Sierhuis, Johan van der Keuken, Jef Diederen, Reinier Lucassen, Peter Schat and Willem Breuker. Since then, the island has turned into an attractive residential and working area. Most of the warehouses, 25m deep, have been divided into apartments. The neighborhood still attracts people with an artistic background: actors, musicians, furniture makers, program makers and artists, such as Benno Premsela, Ans Marcus, Willem Nijholt, Tijmen Ploeg, Raoul Hynckes, Han Wezelaar, Auke Hettema and Martijn Padding.

There are 38 National Historic Landmarks on Prinseneiland.

== Realeneiland ==
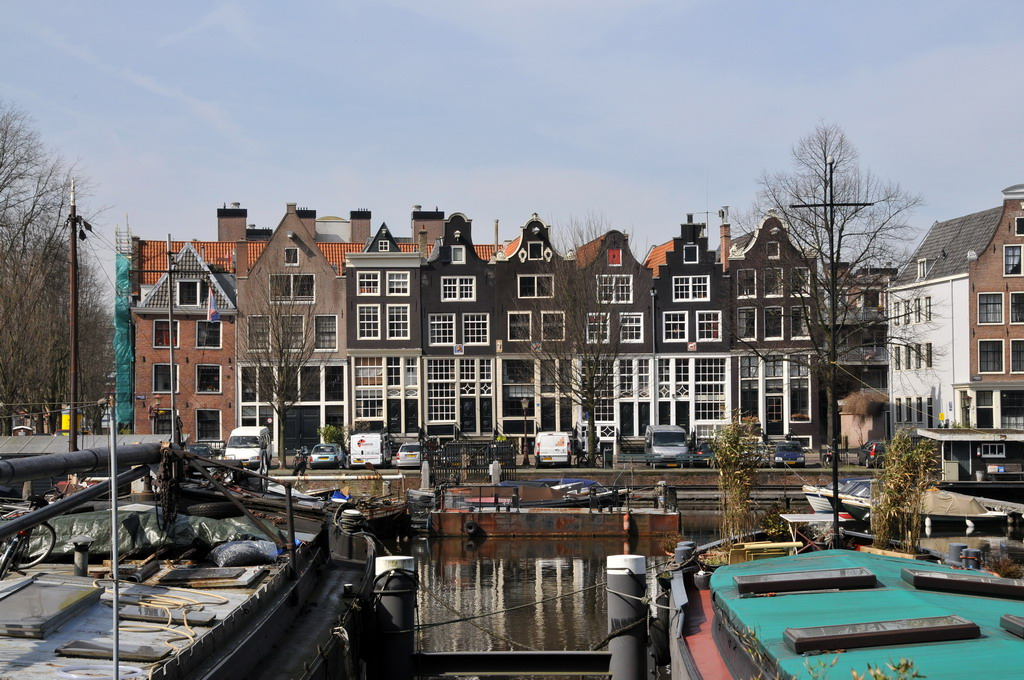
Zandhoek, Amsterdam

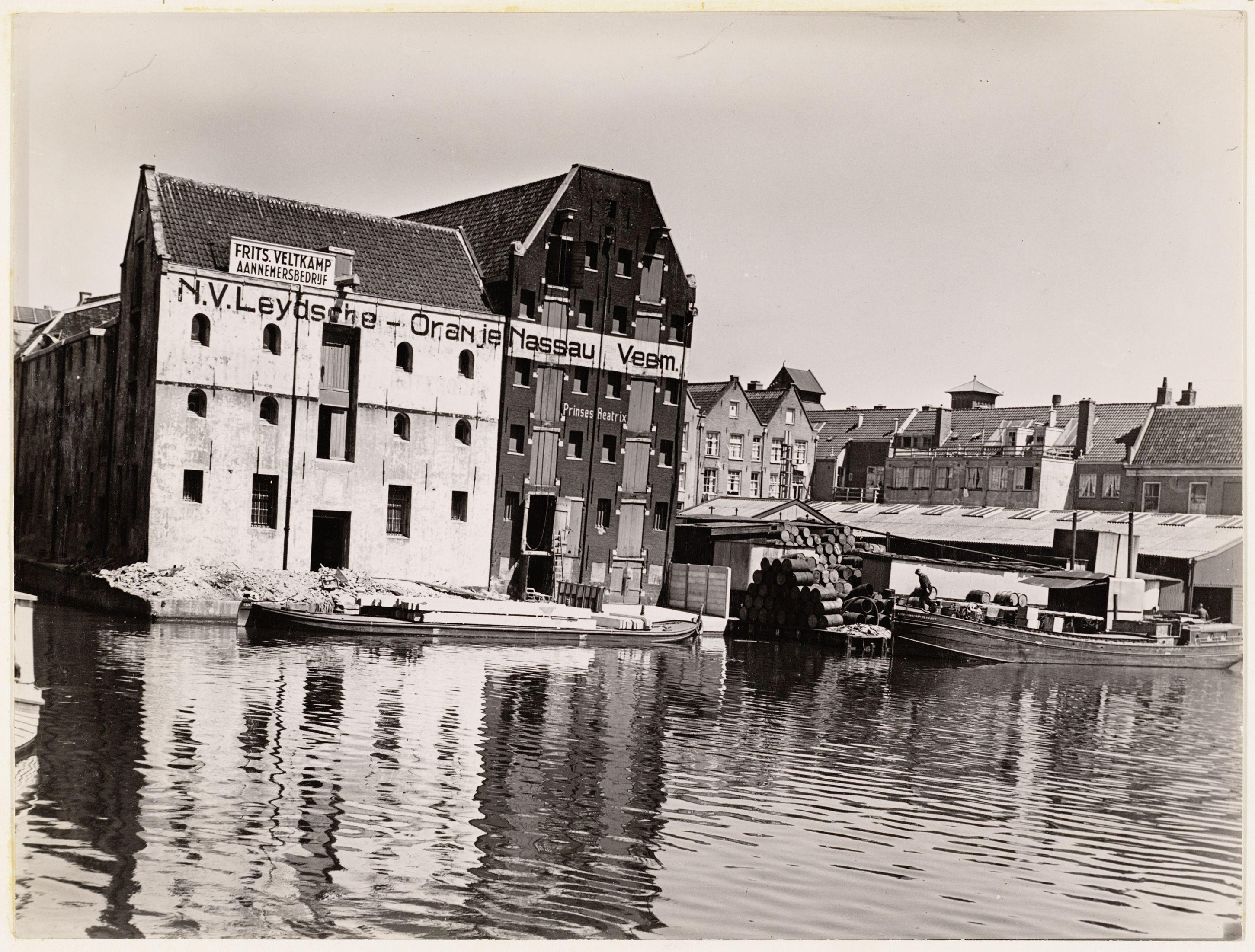
Former salt shack (Heinsiusketen) and wine warehouse in 1945; to the right tar stored in tubs.

The Realeneiland, at first called Achtereiland, was named after the Reael family, who owned land there. Sand was stored on the Zandhoek, which was used for raising streets and neighborhoods in the center.

In 1617 cheap land on the Achtereiland started to be provided to herring fishermen from outside the city. In 1623, construction began on the island. A herring smokehouse was built in 1648 by the Reael family on the Zandhoek, the side that bordered on the IJ (now shielded by Westerdok and Westerdoksdijk). The gable stone depicted a Golden Reaal, a Spanish/Portuguese coin that was used all over the world at the beginning of the 17th century. It showed one holding an image of Emperor Charles V. It made such an impression in the 20th century that the neighborhood was called the Golden Reaal. There are still thirteen impressive captain's houses.

Reynier Reael gave credit to ship carpenters, who did not have to pay rent for the first twelve years, but had to deliver a ship. His heirs had houses built on the island, which the city opposed. The tar company of Joseph Deutz got a large yard on the Realen Island in 1664. Until 1673 there was also a peat market. The Dutch West India Company owned a ropery which was sold in 1650. The city owned carpentry yard. As early as 1676 there was a brandy distillery at the Drieharingenbrug, called De drie gecroonde haringen (The three crowned herrings). These business premises were demolished around 1780 by shipbuilder Haring Booy and rebuilt as a sort of country house. For many years, the tobacco firm British American Tobacco was established on Realeneiland. The island became known through the books of Jan Mens about the Golden Reael.

== Miscellaneous ==
- Jacob Olie came from the Westelijke Eilanden and photographed the area extensively.
- George Hendrik Breitner (1857-1923) and Kees Maks (1876-1967) worked on Prinseneiland.
- The so-called Open Workshop Days take place around Pentecost on the Westelijke Eilanden.

== Gerrit Lamberts ==
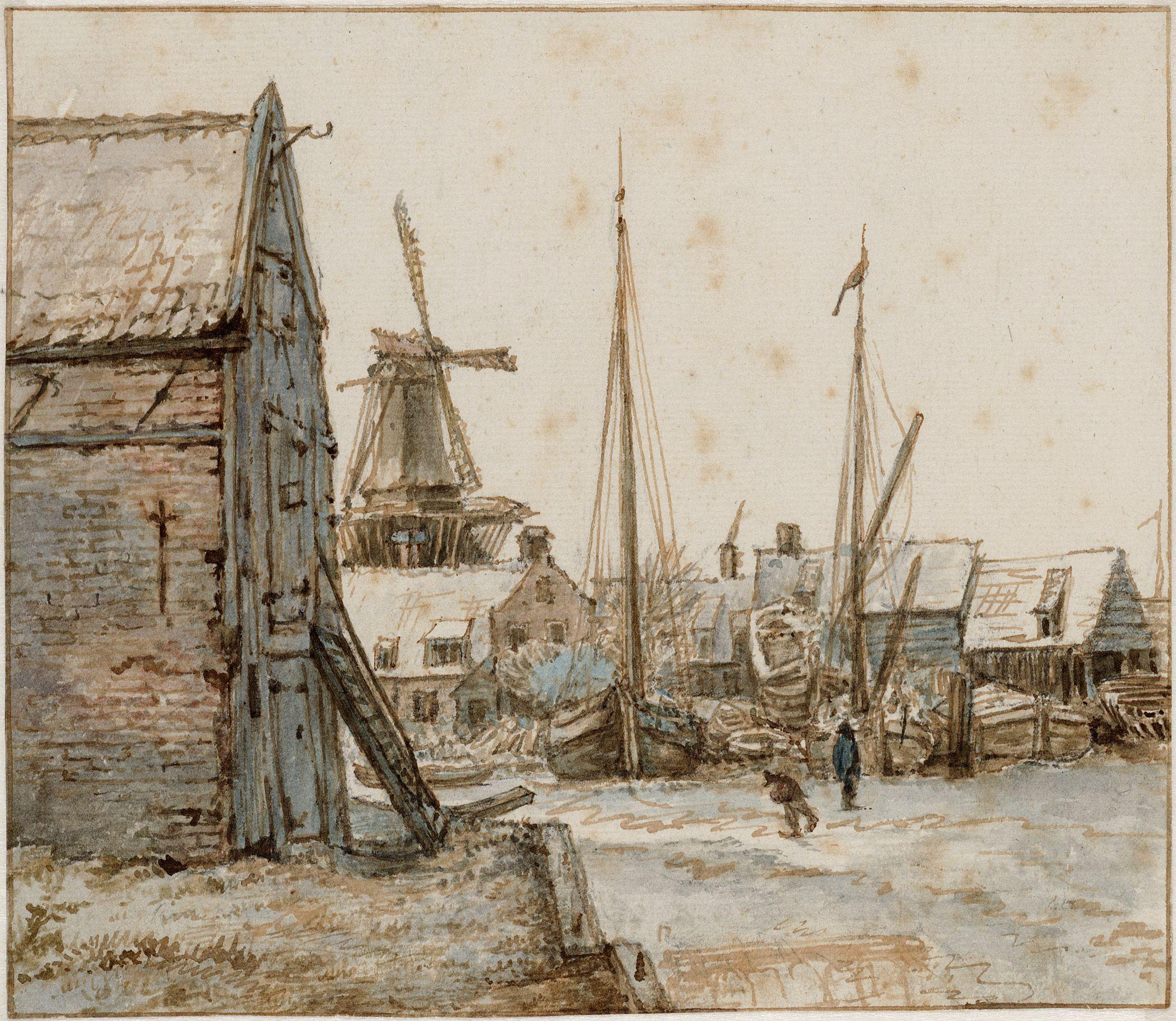
Gerrit Lamberts (1776-1850), Realengracht, looking west.

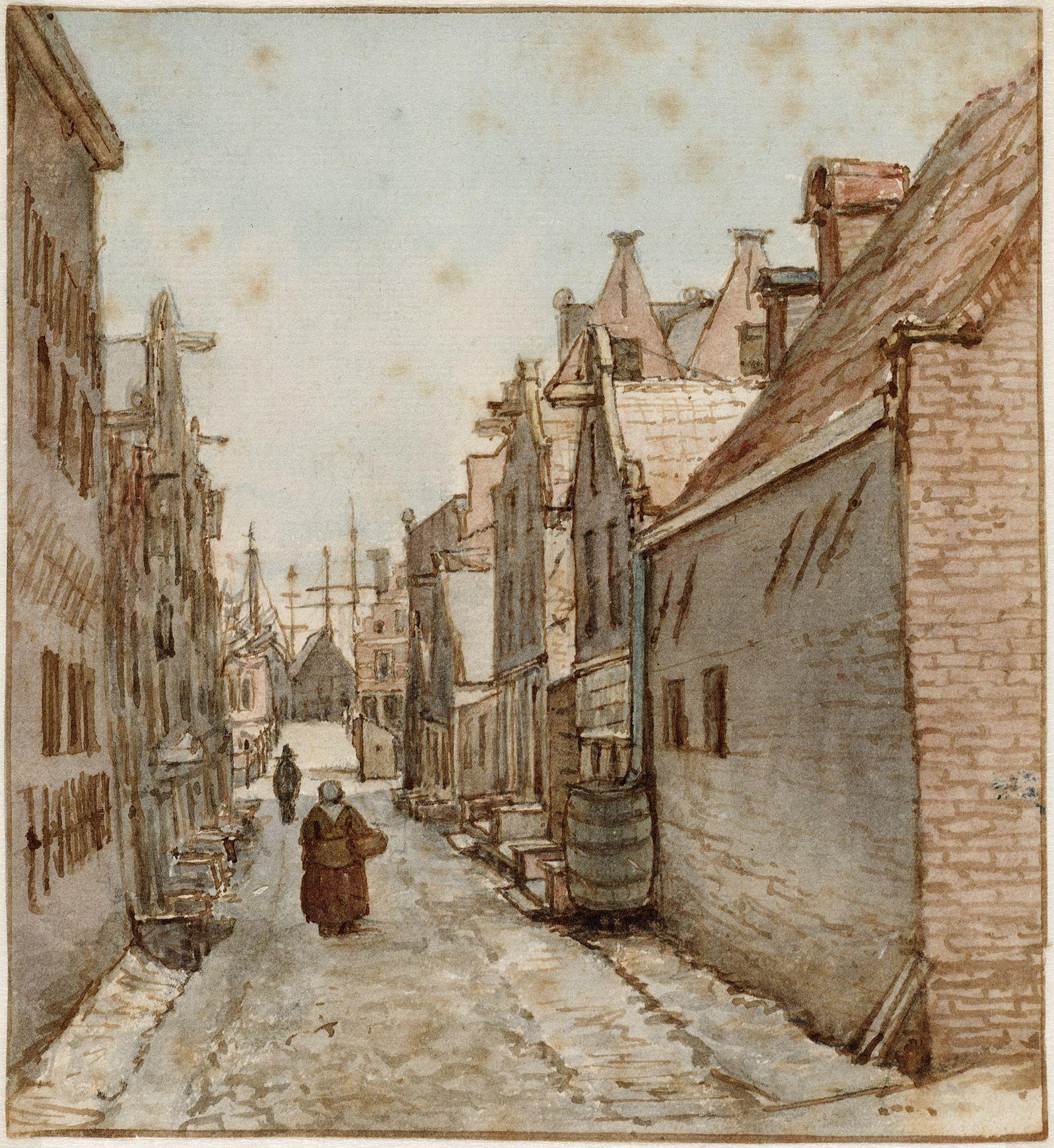
Gerrit Lamberts, Galgenstraat, looking east

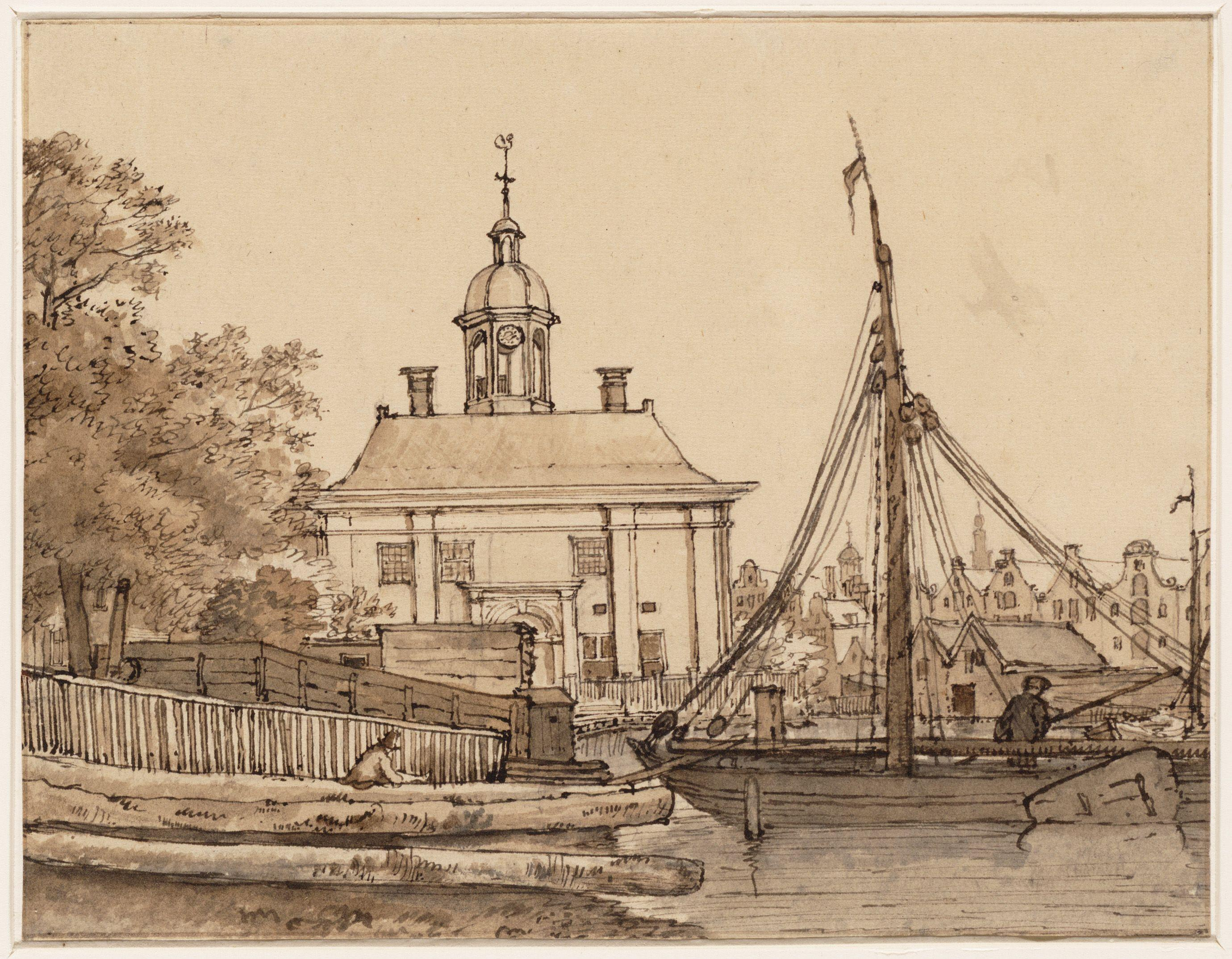
Gerrit Lamberts, Eilanderkerk, looking east

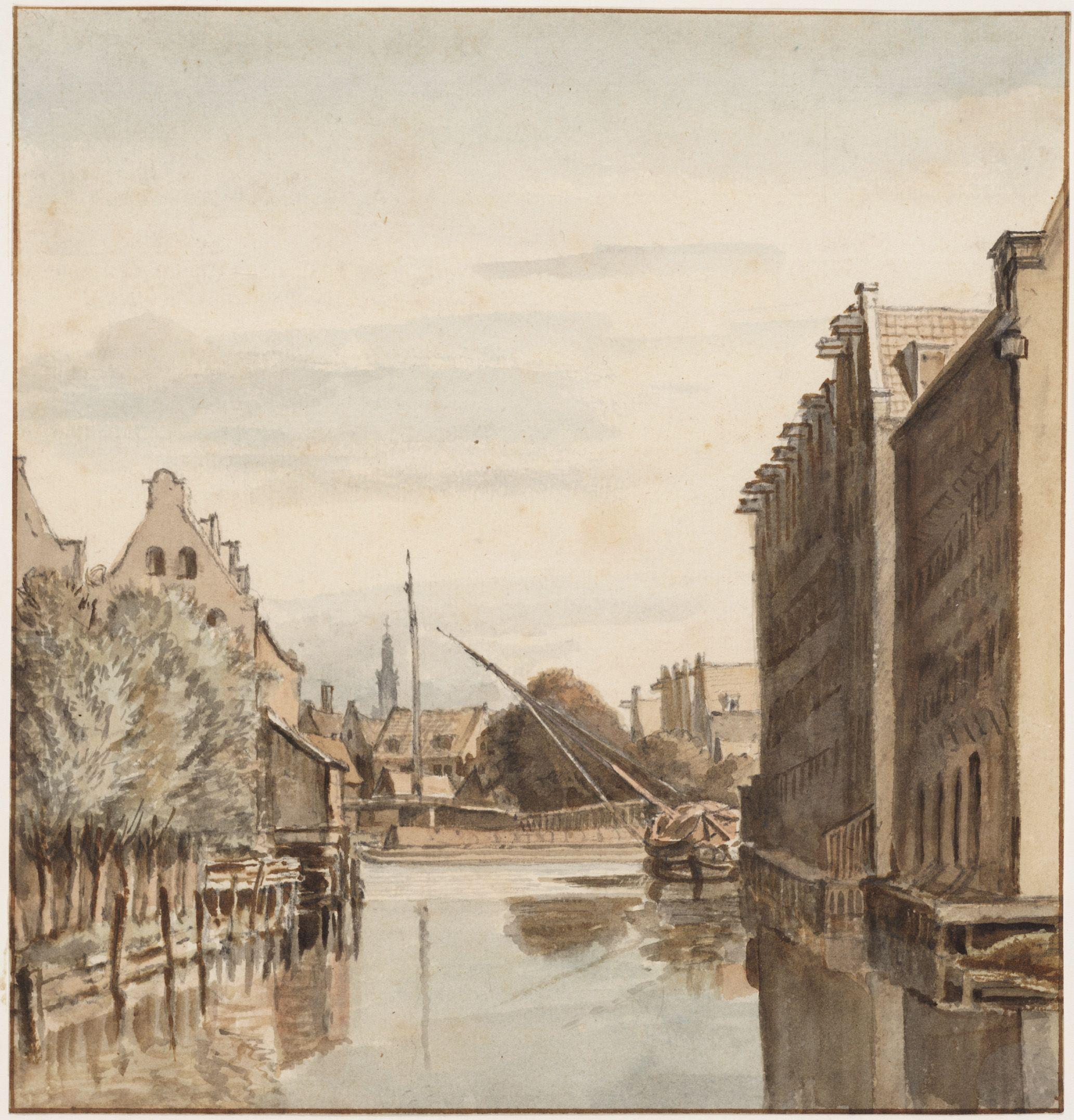
Gerrit Lamberts, Smallepadsgracht, looking south

== Bridges ==
The connections to and between the Westelijke Eilanden consist of drawbridges.

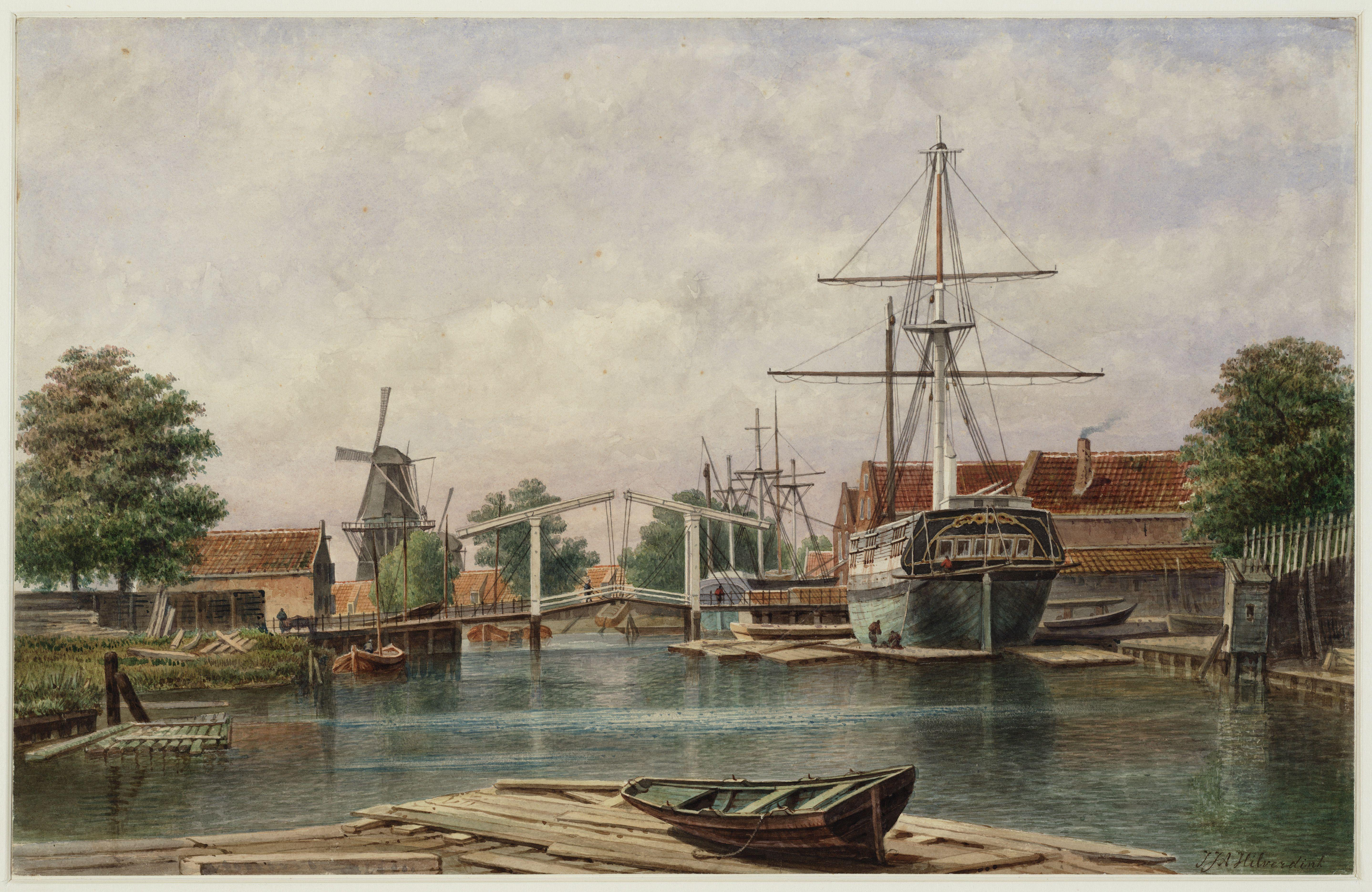
Realengracht in 1855 by Johannes Hilverdink (1813-1902)

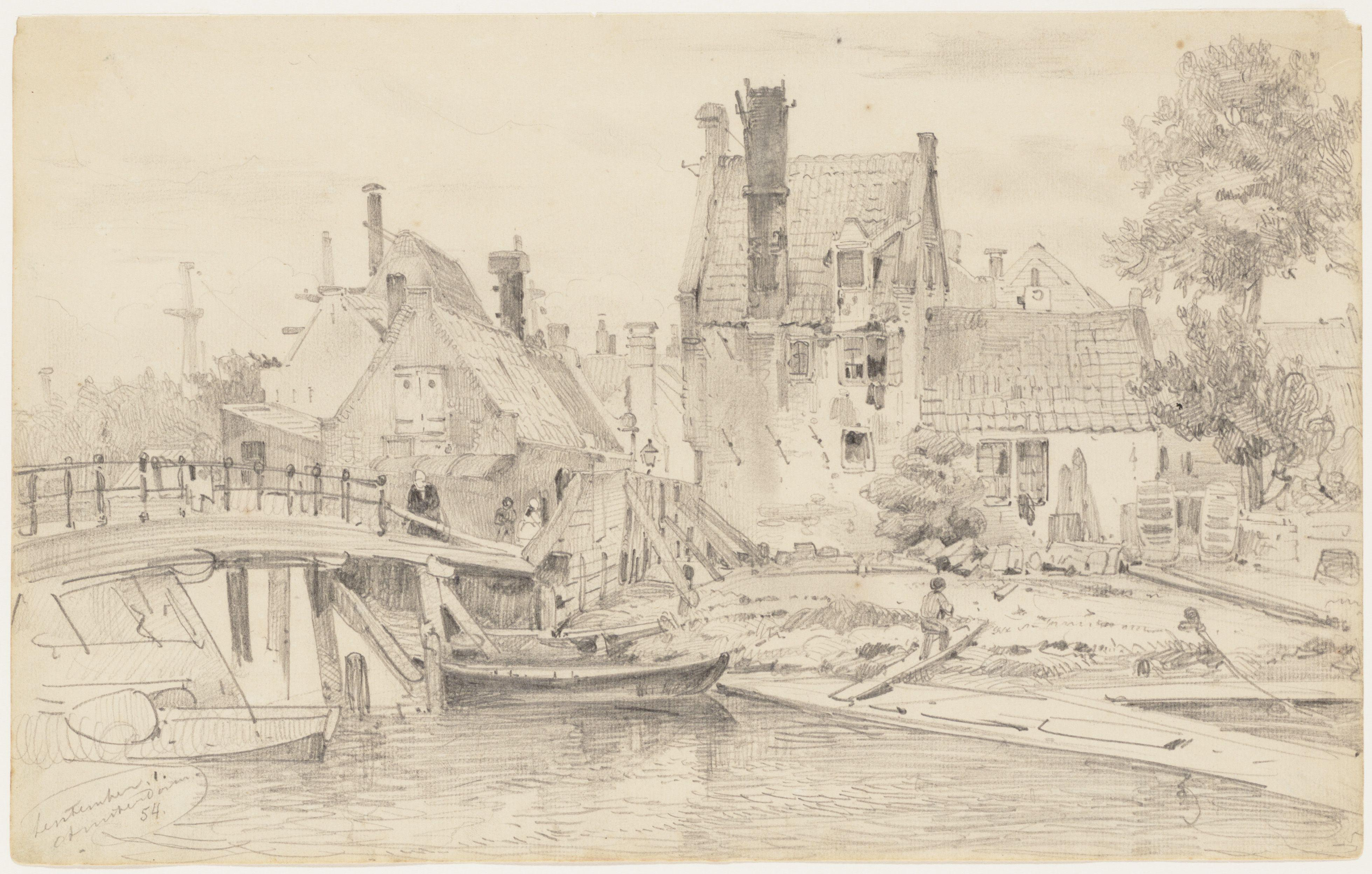
View on Karsseboombrug over Zoutkeetsgracht by W.A. van Deventer (1854)

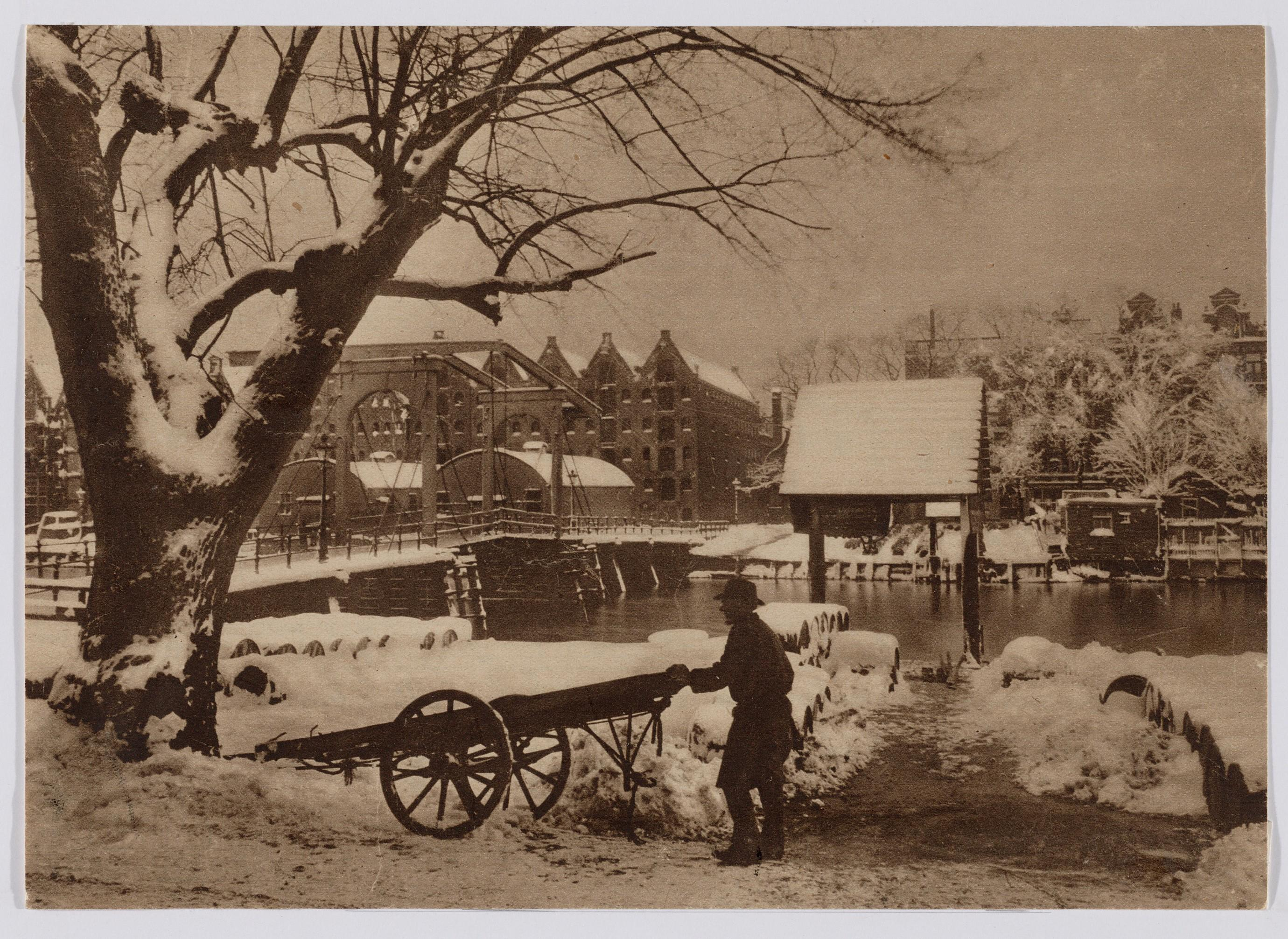
Sloterdijkerbrug to Prinseneiland around 1920

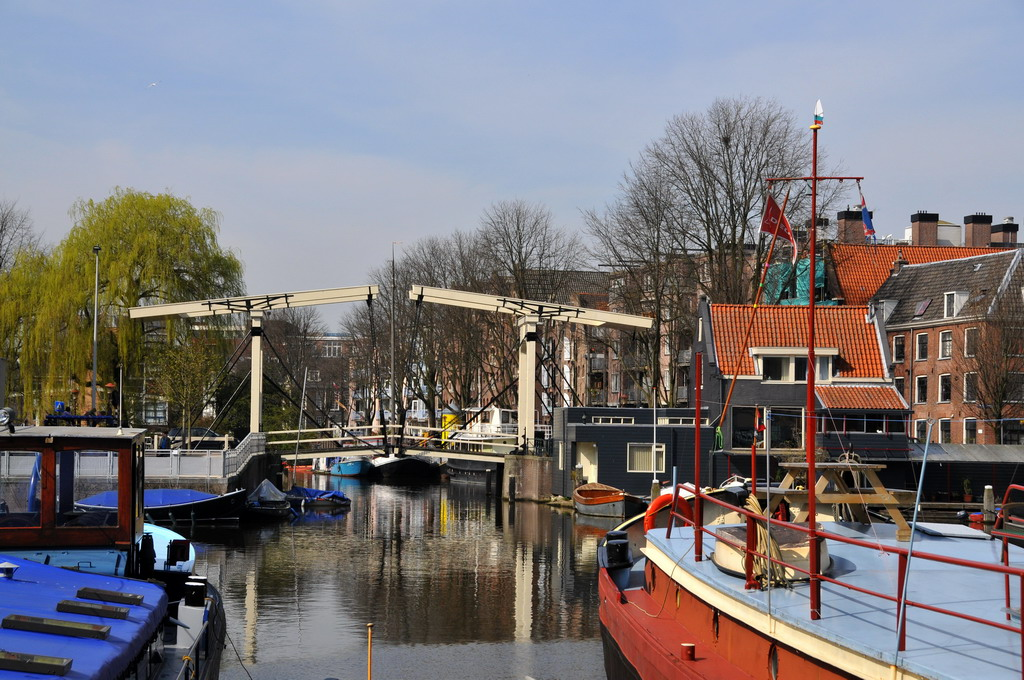
Zandhoek Bridge seen from Westerdok

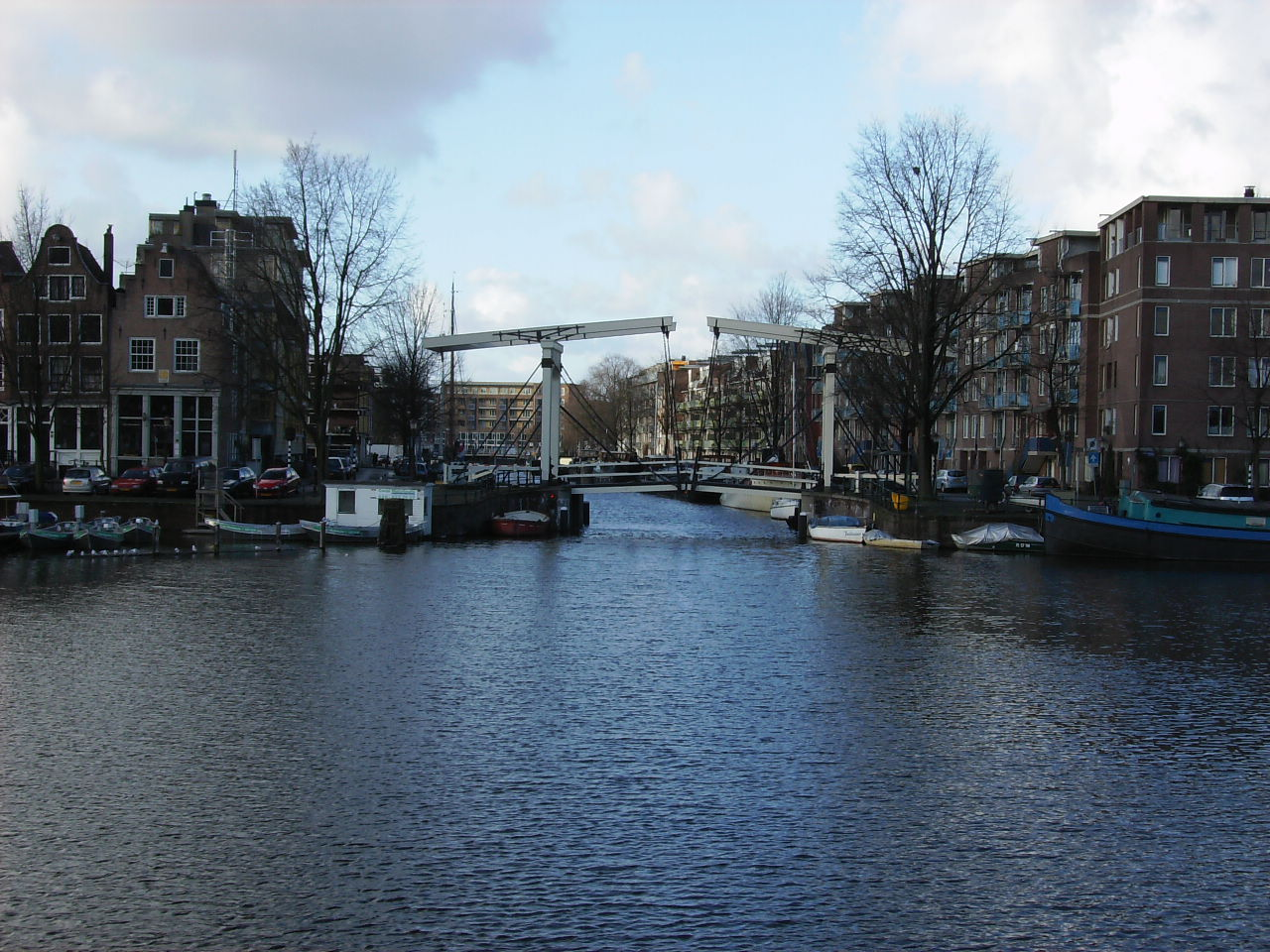
Bridge 317 Petemayen bridge, connection Zeeheldenbuurt to Realeneiland at the Zandhoek

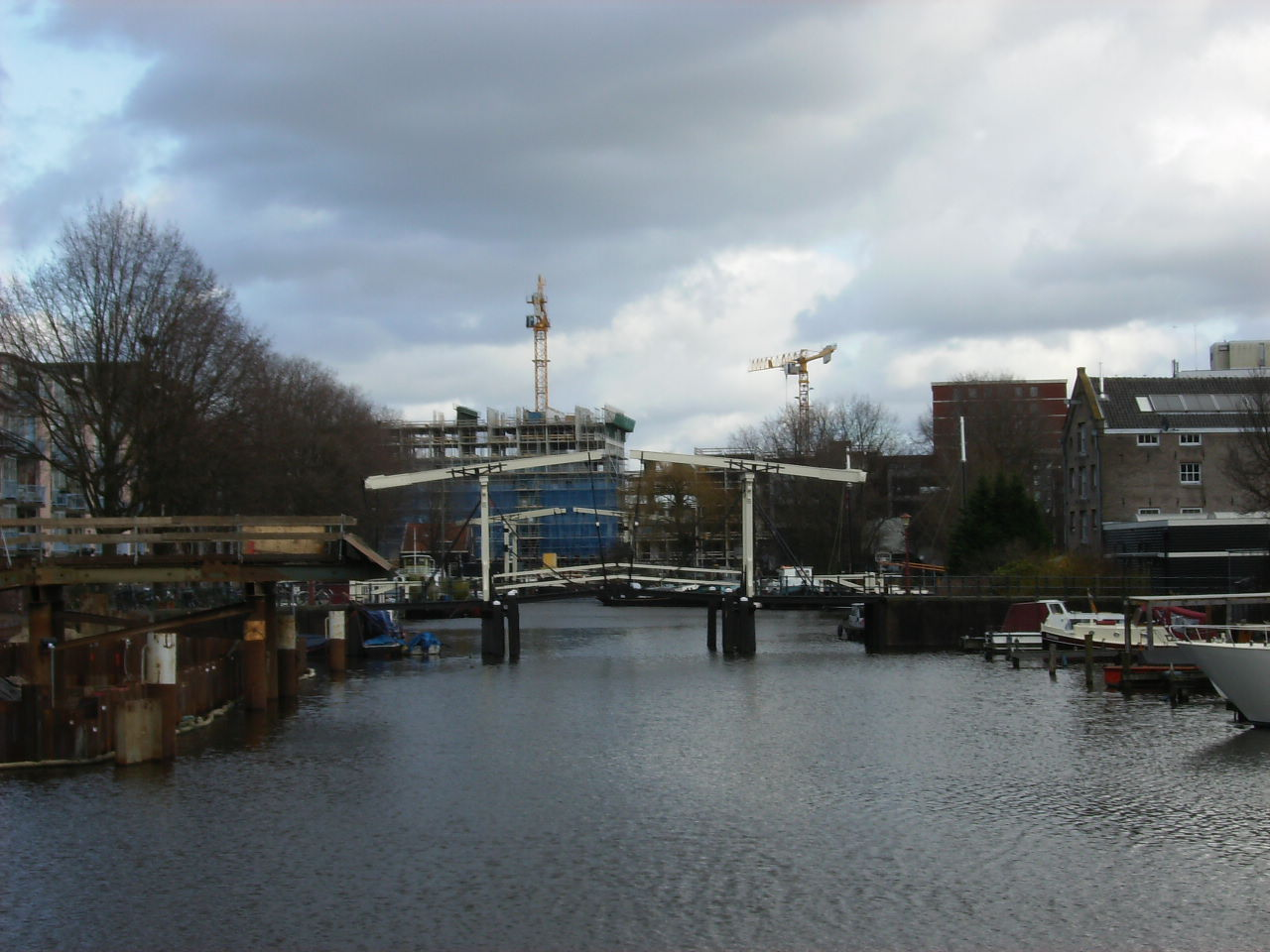
Bridge 320 Drieharingen bridge over Realengracht, behind it Bridge 316 Zandhoek bridge

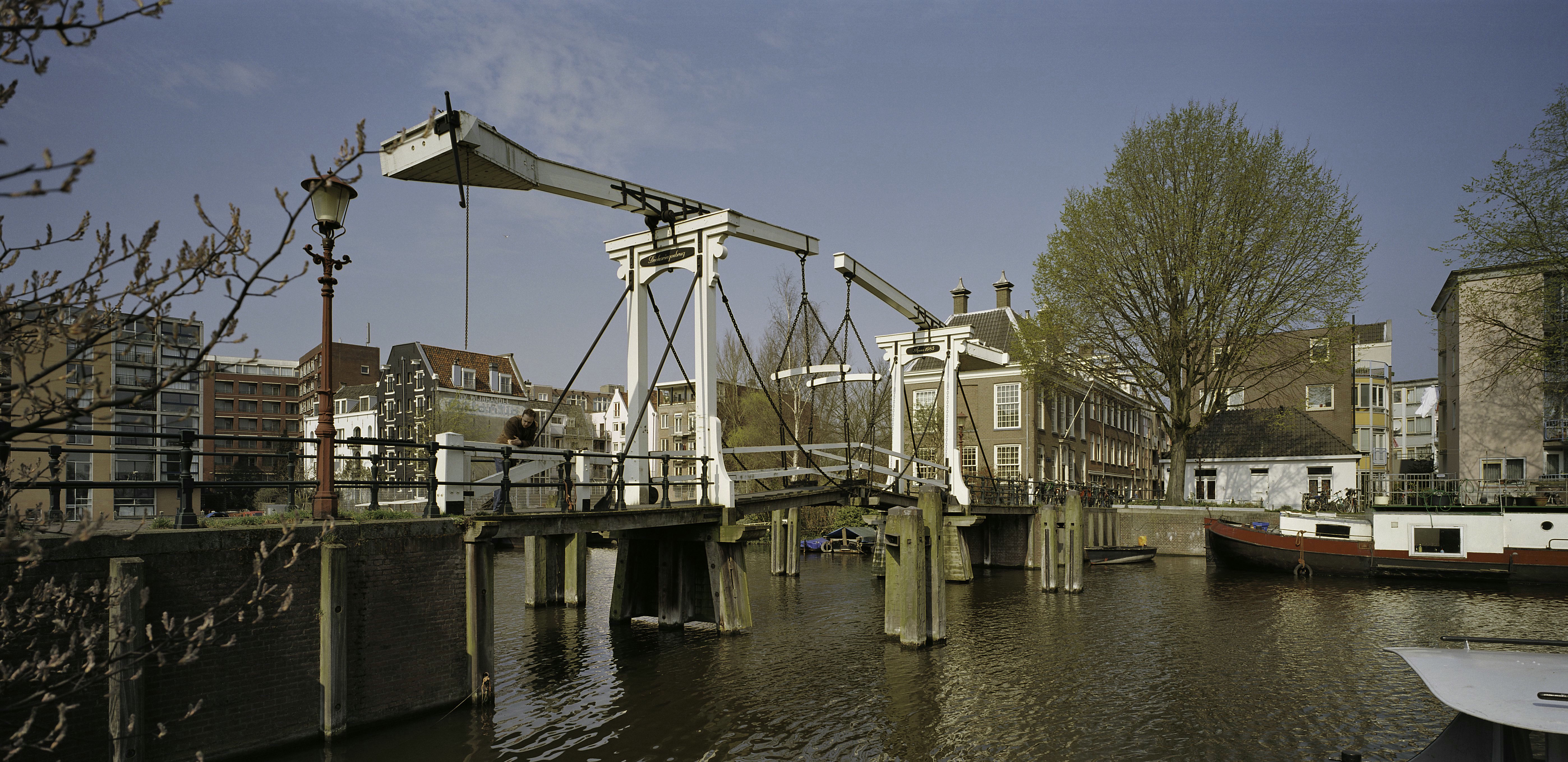
Drieharingen bridge from the south

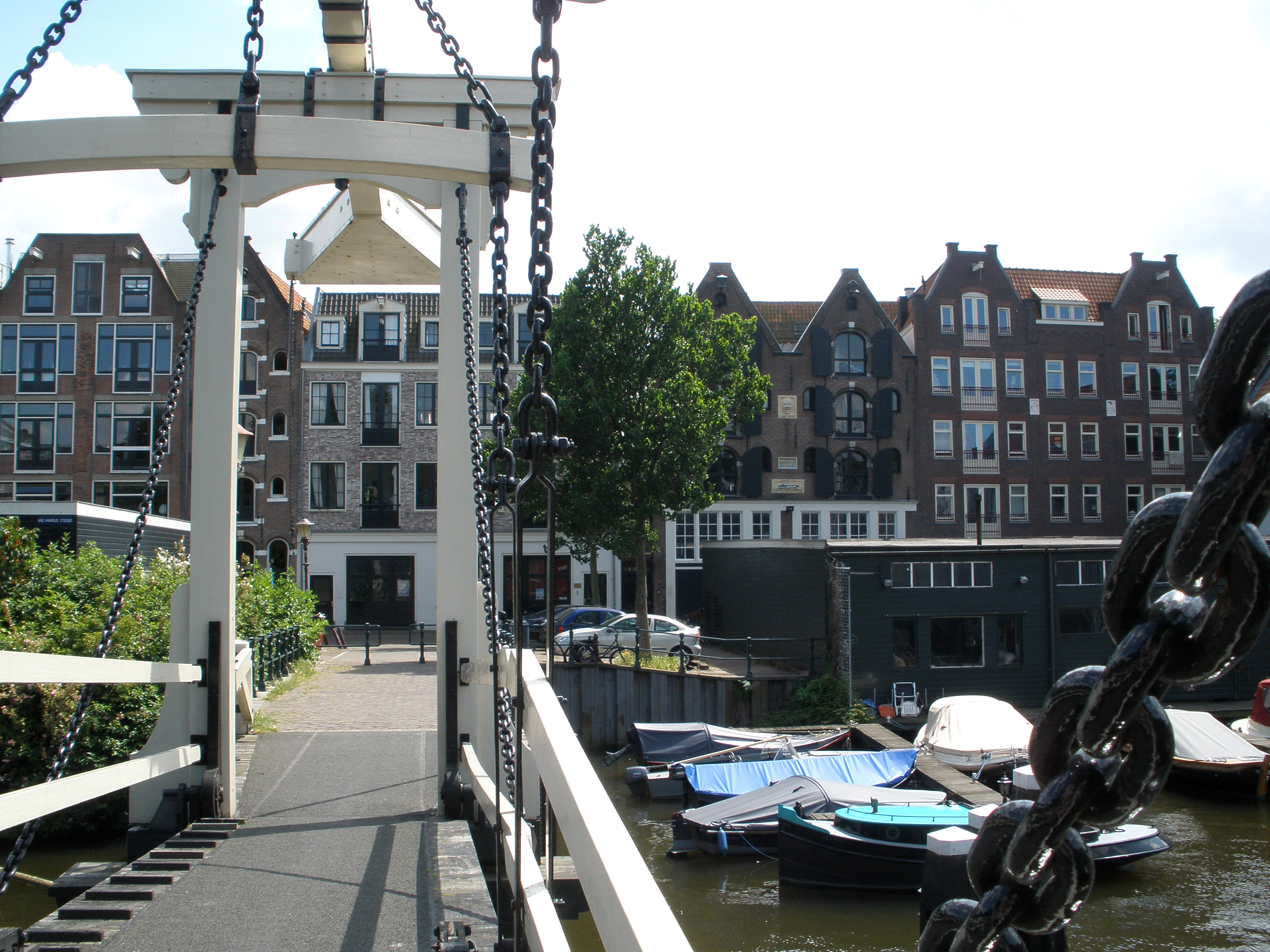
Prinseneiland seen from Drieharingenbrug

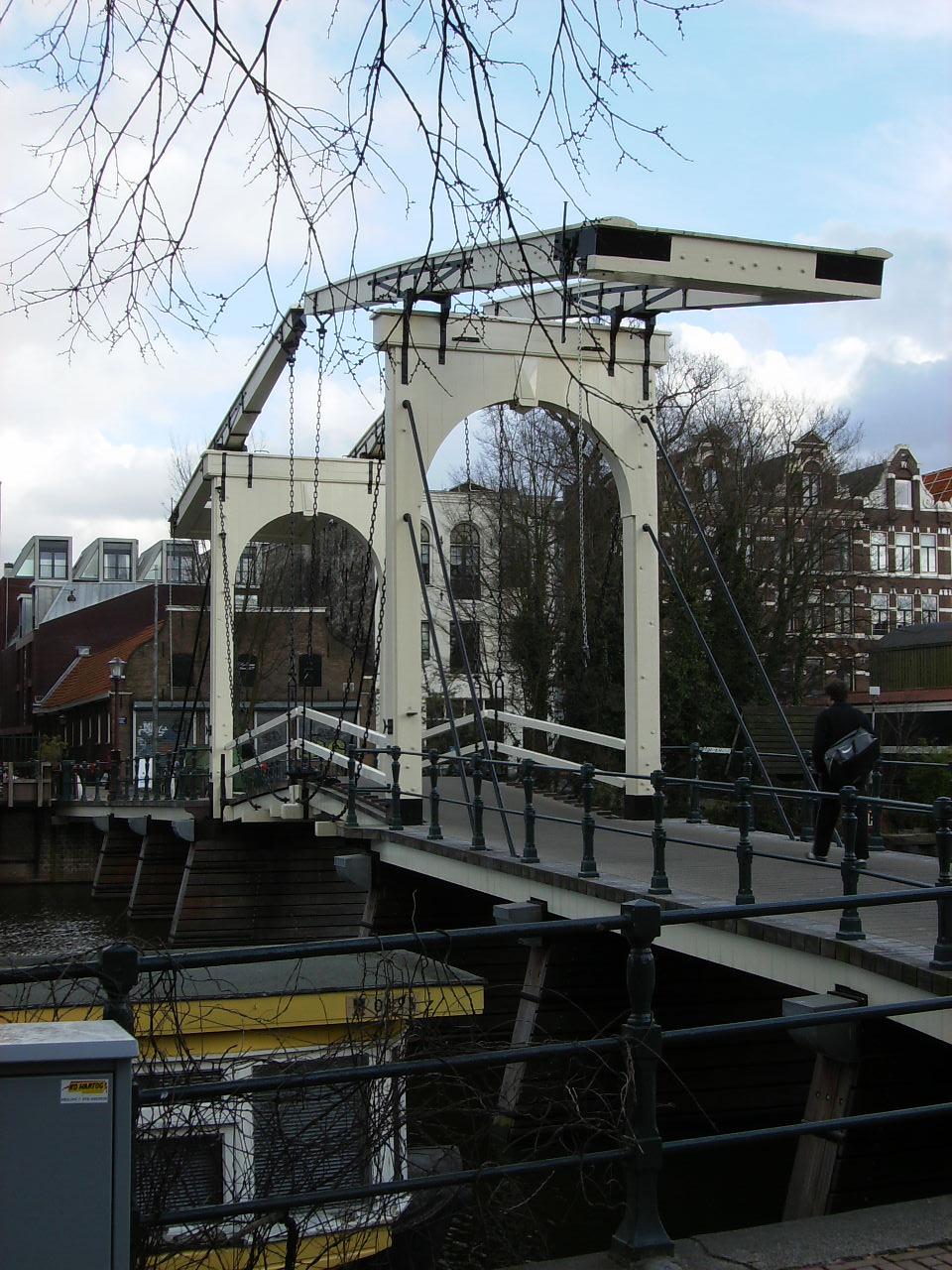
Bridge 321 Sloterdijker bridge, connection Zeeheldenbuurt to Prinseneiland

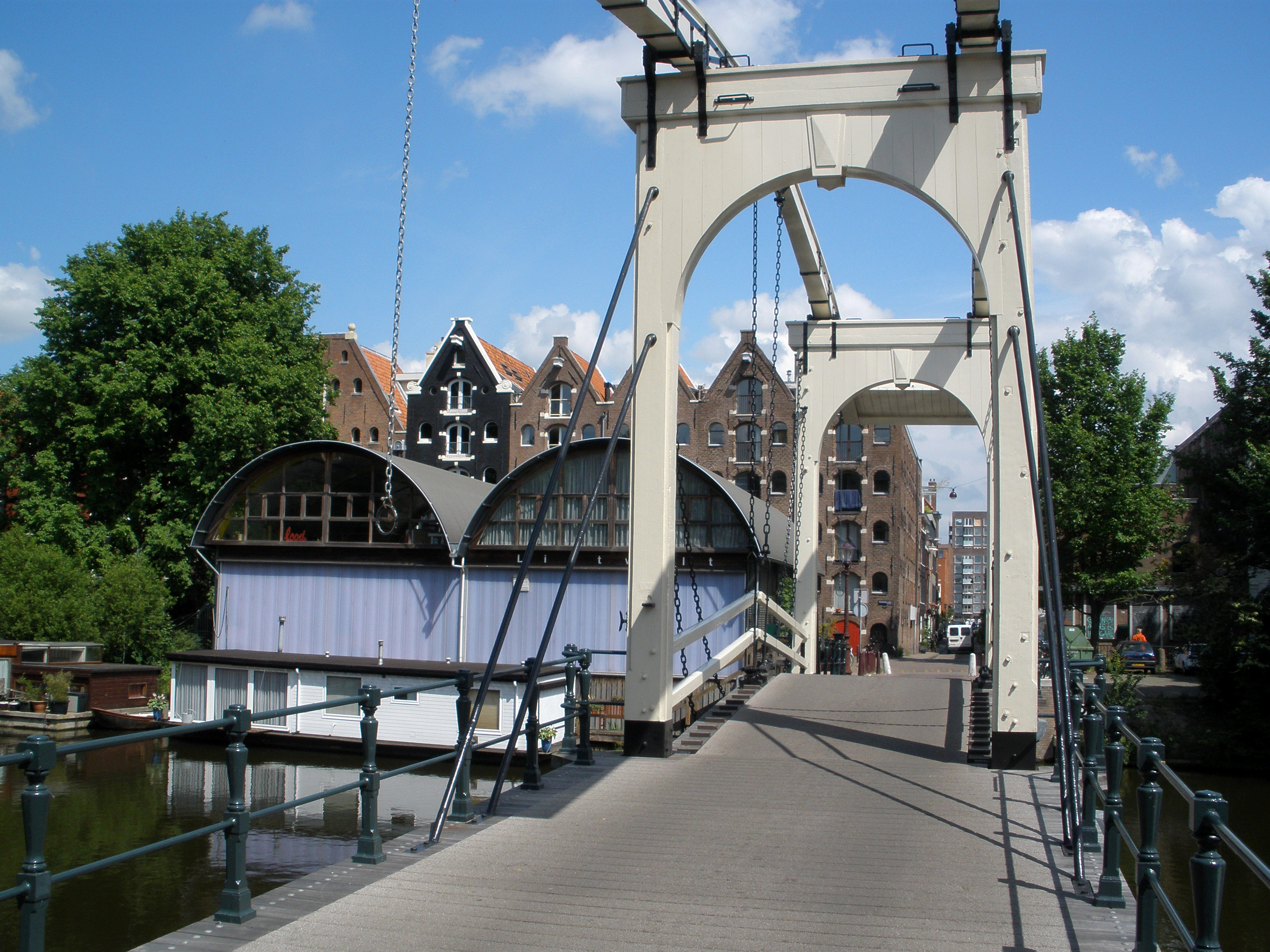
Sloterdijkerbrug, a wooden drawbridge to Prinseneiland

== See also ==
- Gouden Reael

== Sources ==
- Abrahamse, J.E. (2010), De grote uitleg van Amsterdam. Stadsontwikkeling in de 17e eeuw
- Arnoldussen, P. (2007), Amsterdams mooiste straat
- Kerncijfers wijken en buurten 2017, Centraal Bureau voor de Statistiek, 31 July 2017
- Kruizinga, J.H. (1986), De westelijke eilanden van Amsterdam
