= Gouden Reael =

Area in Amsterdam

Coordinates: 52°23′10″N 4°53′16″E

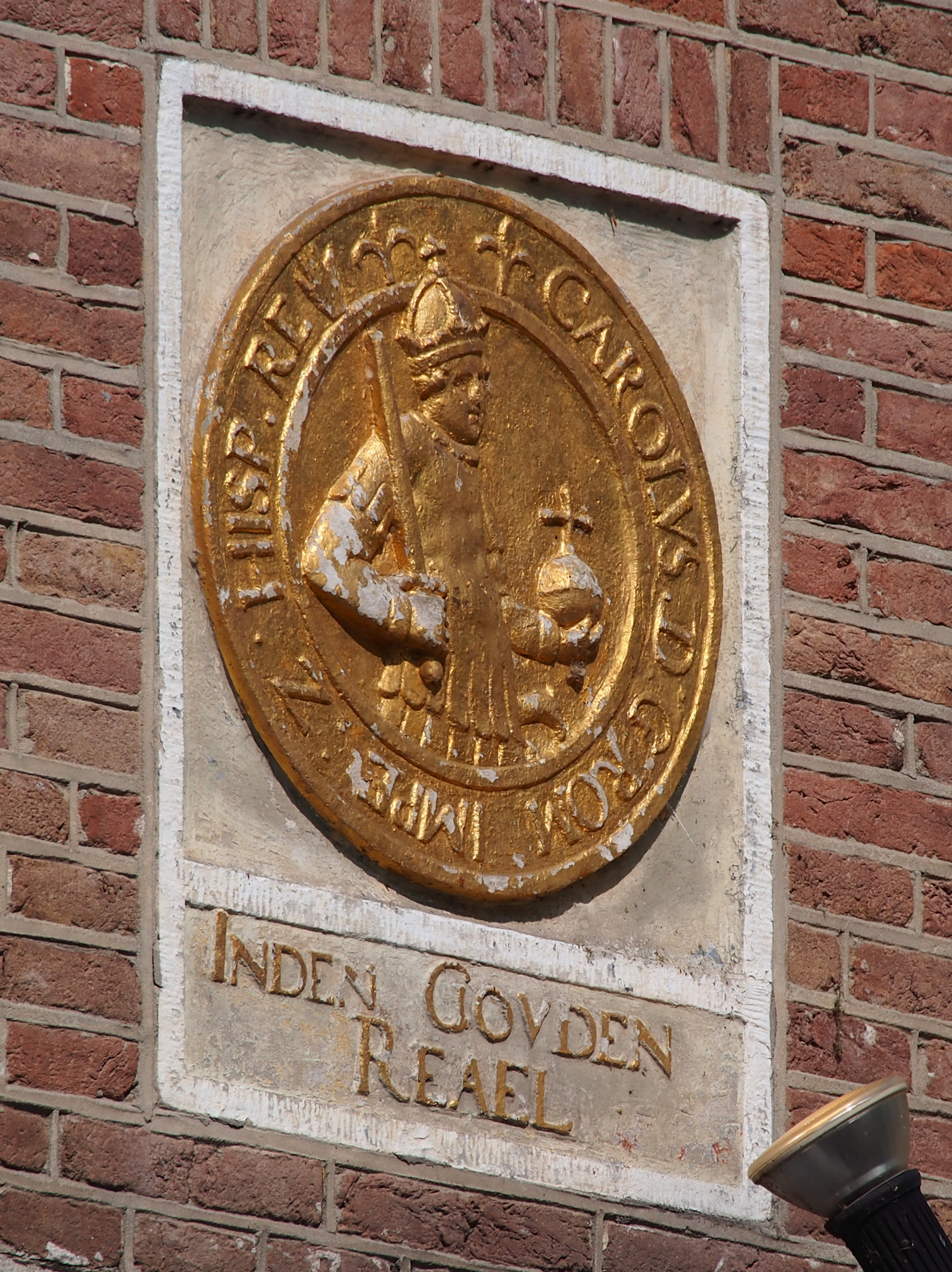
Zandhoek 14: gable stone INDEN GOVDEN REAEL

The Gouden Reael is a traditional designation for an area of the city of Amsterdam in the Netherlands.

It consists of the current neighborhood Westelijke Eilanden ("Western Islands", i.e. Prinseneiland, Bickerseiland and Realeneiland) plus the Westerdokseiland, Haarlemmerbuurt and Planciusbuurt.

A 'Gouden Reael' ("golden real") was a Spanish coin from the 16th century. The birth house of Laurens Reael (1583–1637), third Governor-General of the Dutch East Indies, had a golden real on its signpost or gable stone, from which the family took its name. In 1648, the Reael family, which counted several prominent Amsterdam citizens, built a warehouse on the Zandhoek, again with a golden real gablestone. Around 1800, this building turned into a popular inn, "De Gouden Reael", which was made famous by a 1940 Jan Mens novel by the same name, and after which the neighborhood has been named.

In 1610 and 1615, three artificial islands (Prinseneiland, Bickerseiland and Realeneiland) were built as an extension of the harbor. Until the end of the 19th century this was an area with many wharfs, little industries and warehouses, related to the shipping trades. After the second World war the desolated area was discovered by many artists (Jan Sierhuis, Johan van der Keuken, Jef Diederen, Reinier Lucassen, Peter Schat among others), who established their homes and studios in the vacant buildings. During the second half of the 20th century the old warehouses were transformed into apartments one after another, and new apartments were built. Nevertheless, a lot of the atmosphere of the past is still present in the old buildings and wooden drawbridges.
