= Sierhuis =

Sierhuis is a surname. Notable people with the surname include:

- Jan Sierhuis (1928–2023), Dutch painter
- Kaj Sierhuis (born 1998), Dutch footballer
