= Rijksdienst voor het Cultureel Erfgoed =

Dutch heritage organisation

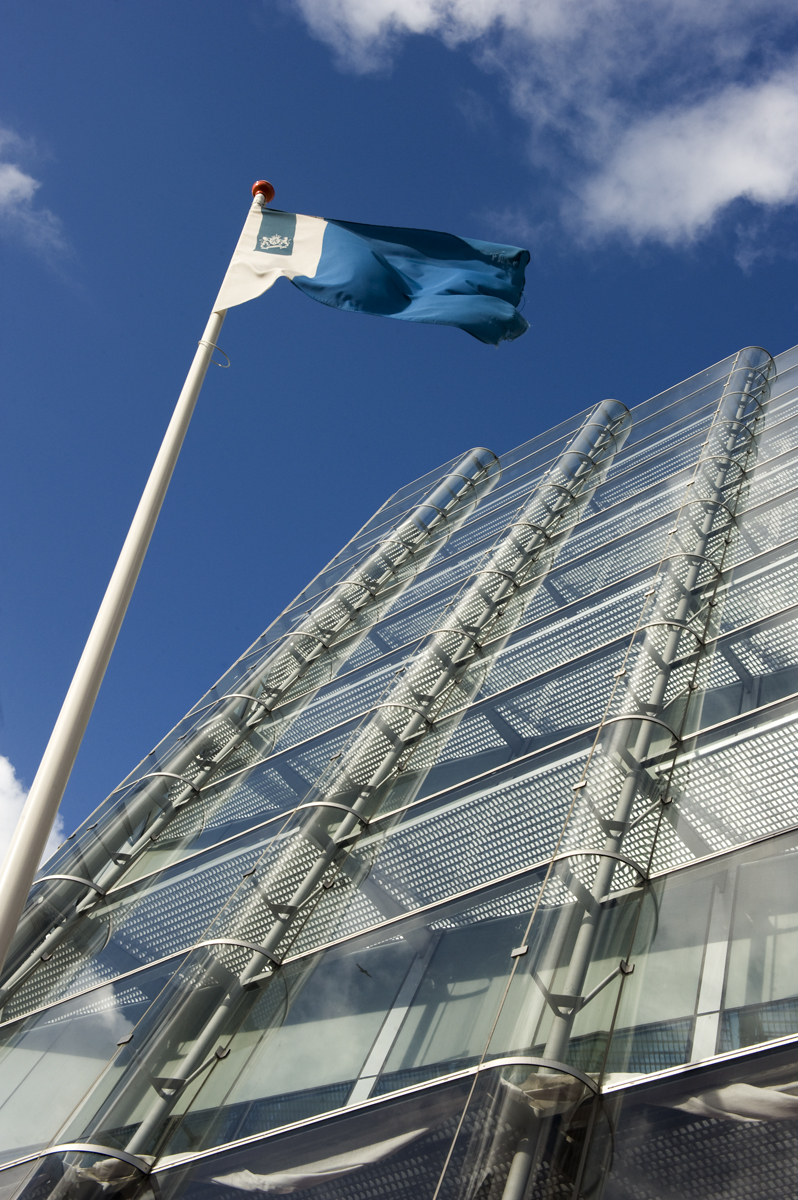
RCE headquarters, Amersfoort

Rijksdienst voor het Cultureel Erfgoed (RCE, Cultural Heritage Agency of the Netherlands) often abbreviated as Cultureel Erfgoed, is a Dutch heritage organisation working for the protection and conservation of National Heritage Sites. It is located in Amersfoort within the province of Utrecht.

== Responsibilities ==
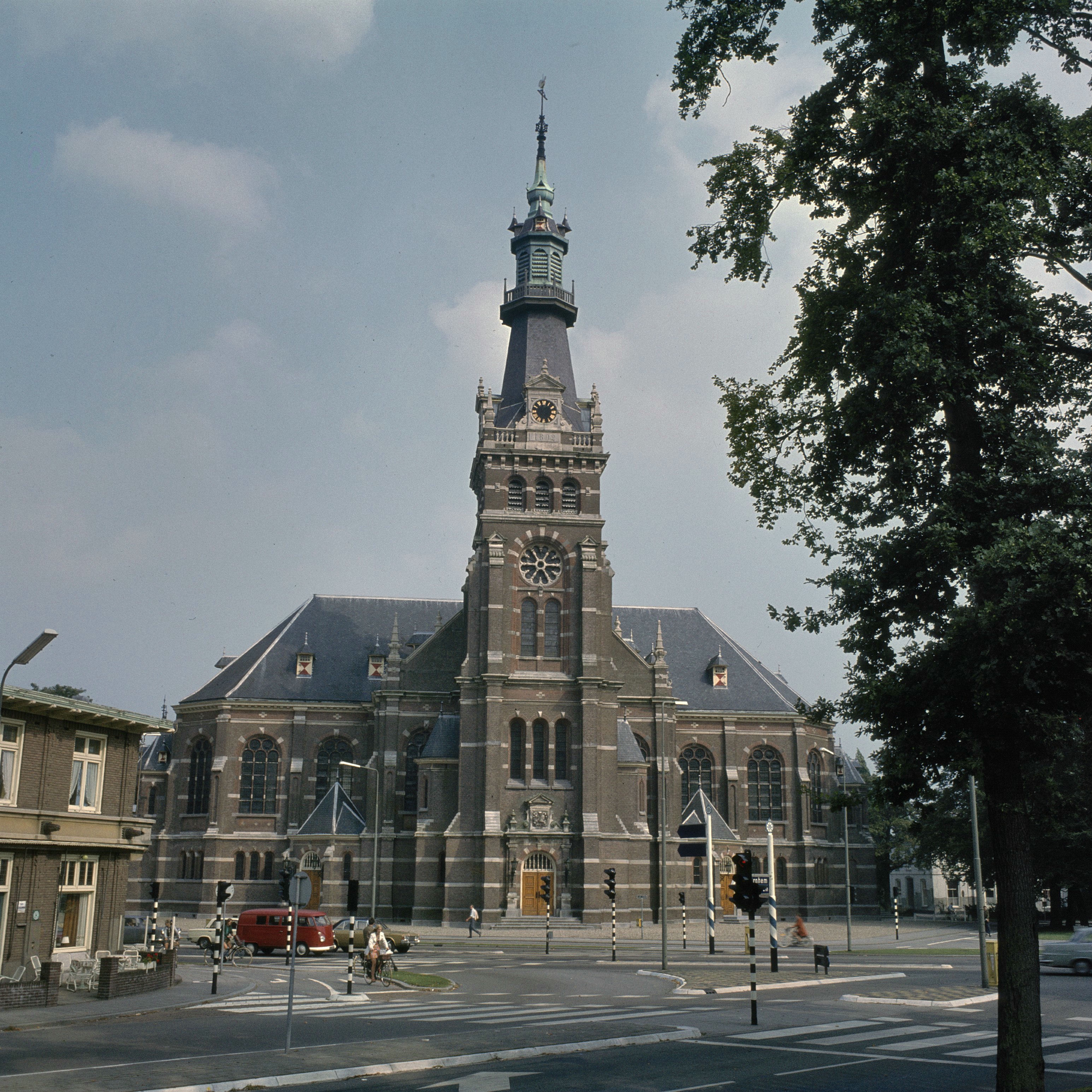
Front of the Grote Kerk (Dutch Reformed main church) - Apeldoorn - 20369718 - RCE

Cultureel Erfgoed is a department of the Dutch Ministry of Education, Culture and Science. Their responsibilities include managing the official list of Rijksmonumenten known as the Monumentenregister, the storage and restoration of the National art collection of the Netherlands, the National Archaeological Ship storage and fleet, and Archis, the central archaeological information system. They also subsidize grants in the fields of both movable and immovable cultural heritage. The RCE carries out the Dutch law known as the "Monumentenwet 1988" (English: Cultural property law), and wherever registered cultural heritage is threatened, the department takes action, whether by advising the proper authorities, by conducting public campaigns and education programs, or through legal action.

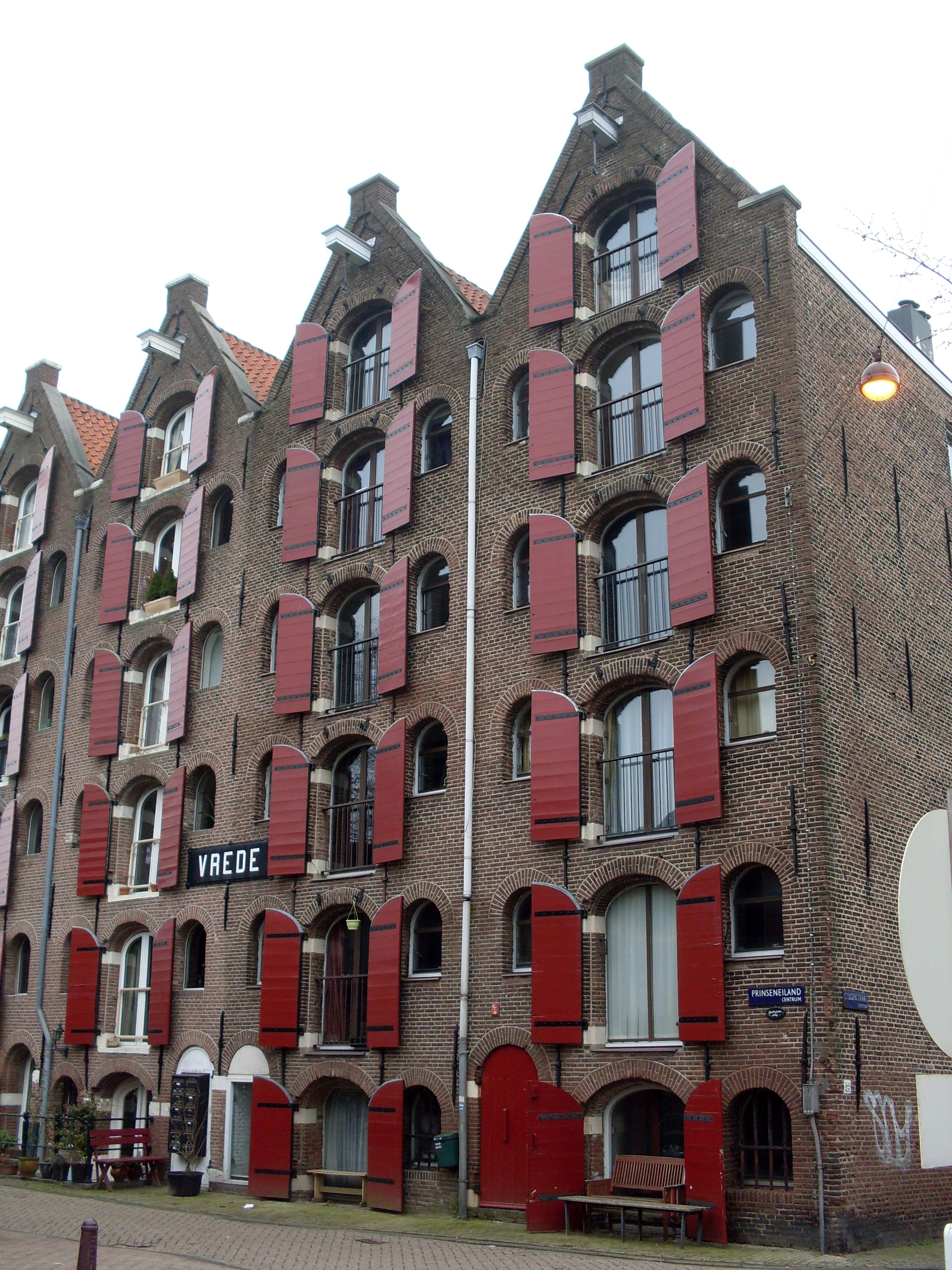
Prinseneiland 83, Amsterdam. Restored former warehouses for the trade with the Baltic have been converted into apartments.

Registered city or village views considered to be important to the country's heritage (known as Beschermde stads- of dorpsgezichten) are also protected by the Rijksdienst voor Cultureel Erfgoed.

== History ==
In 1875, the Dutch Ministry of Internal Affairs founded the department Kunsten en Wetenschap (Arts and Sciences), which awarded grants for cultural property restoration. In 1903, there was a Rijkscommissie to publish an Inventory and Description of Dutch monuments of History and Art (Inventaris en Beschrijving van de Nederlandsche monumenten van Geschiedenis en Kunst ), which in 1918 became the Rijksbureau voor de Monumentenzorg (Bureau for Cultural property Care). In 1947, this organisation was renamed the Rijksdienst voor de Monumentenzorg. The archeological part of this organisation separated in 1947 into the Rijksdienst voor het Oudheidkundig Bodemonderzoek, which in 1995 merged with the Nederlands Instituut voor Scheeps- en onderwaterarcheologie (NISA). The archeological and cultural property departments merged in 2006 and became the Rijksdienst voor Archeologie, Cultuurlandschap en Monumenten (RACM). In 2009, this organisation was renamed to the Rijksdienst voor het Cultureel Erfgoed (RCE) and moved into a new building in Amersfoort.

== Creative Commons ==
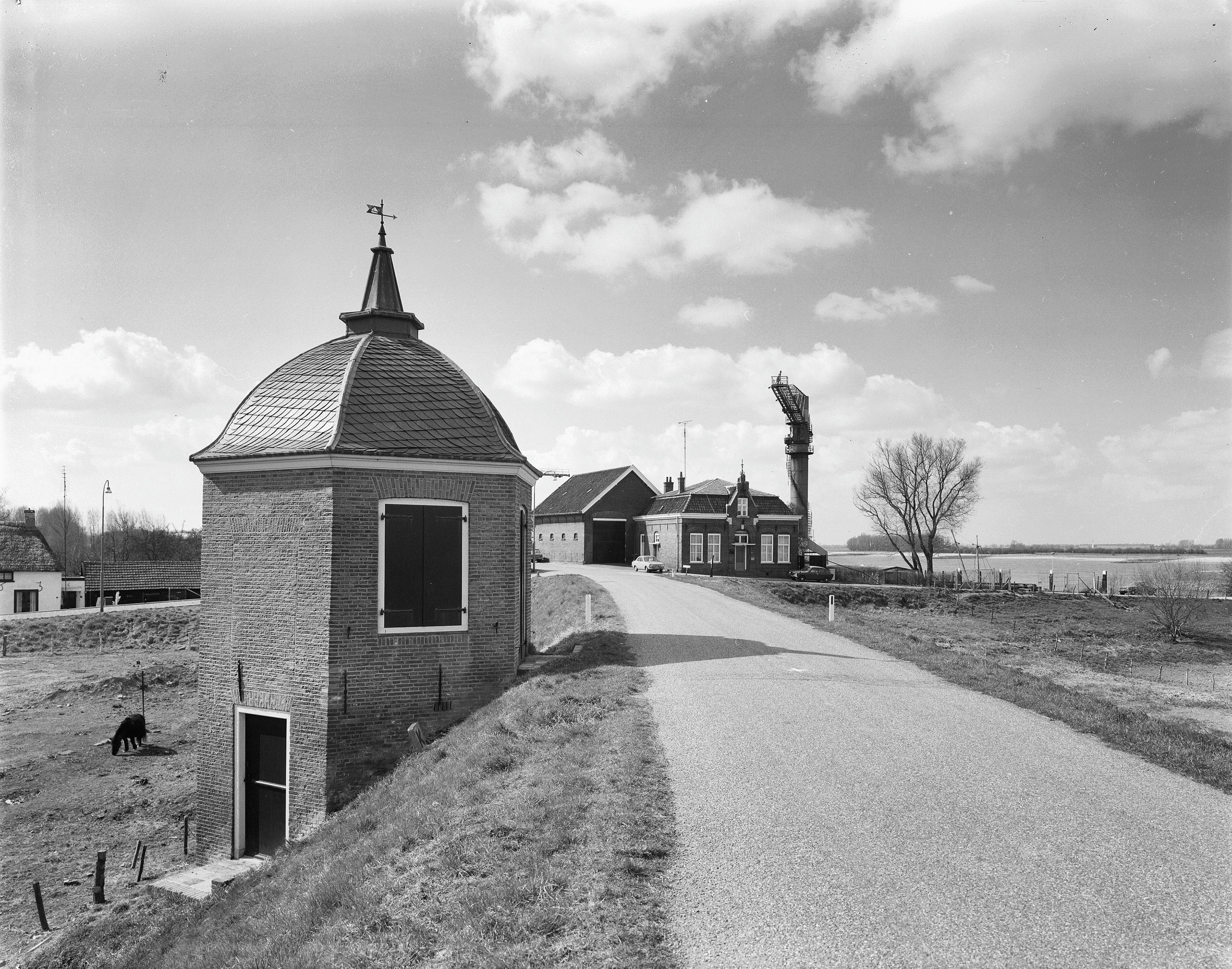
Teahouse - Druten - 20064988 - RCE

In April/May 2011, the RCE released its collection of 550,000 images online at beeldbank.cultureelerfgoed.nl. In September 2012, the first uploads to Wikimedia Commons were made. In December 2012, a bot started to mass upload images; approximately 450,000 images have been uploaded.

== See also ==
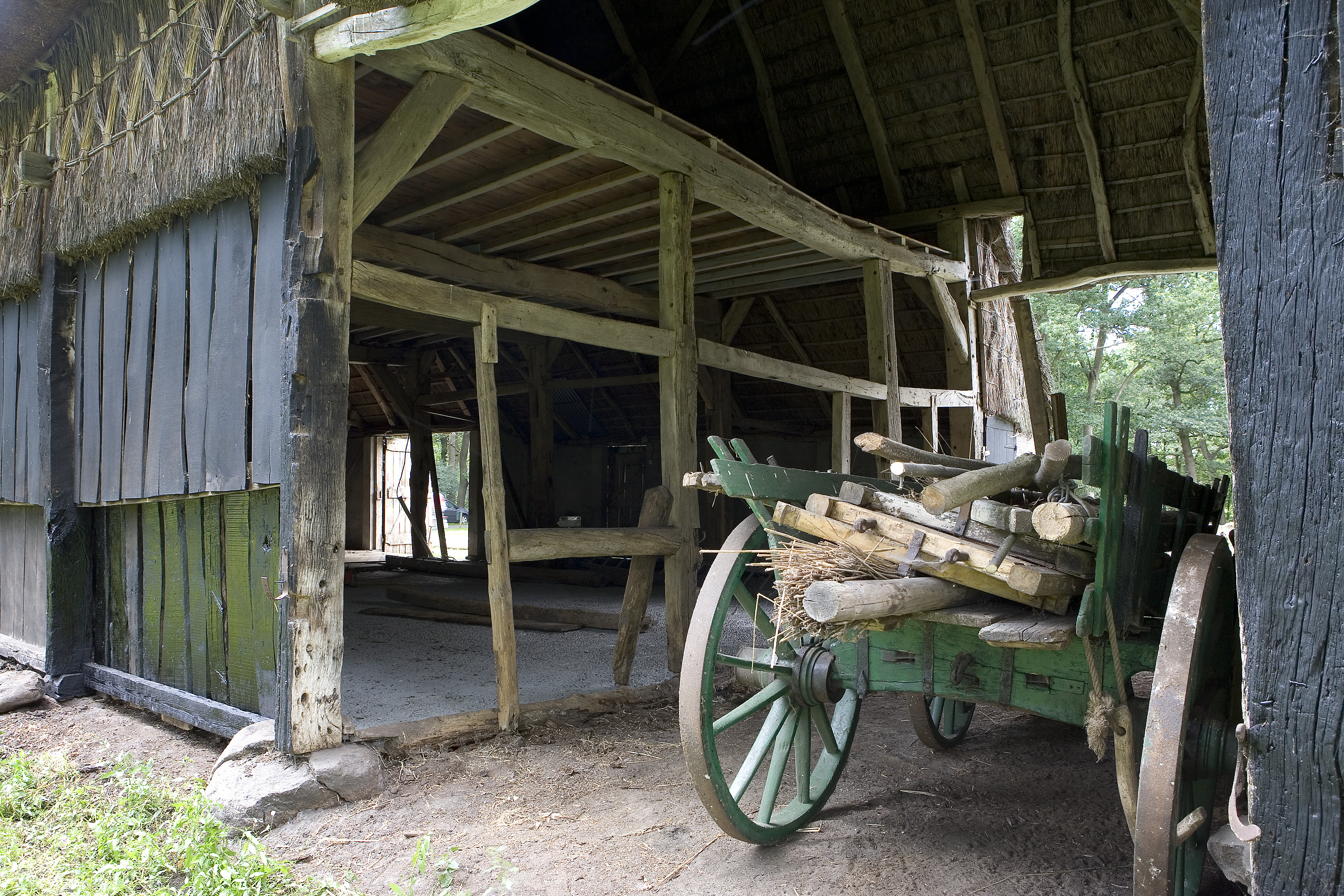
Farmer's shed - Schoonebeek - 20411613 - RCE

- List of Rijksmonuments
- List of World Heritage Sites in the Netherlands
- Rijksmonument
- De Ross
