= Laurens Reael =

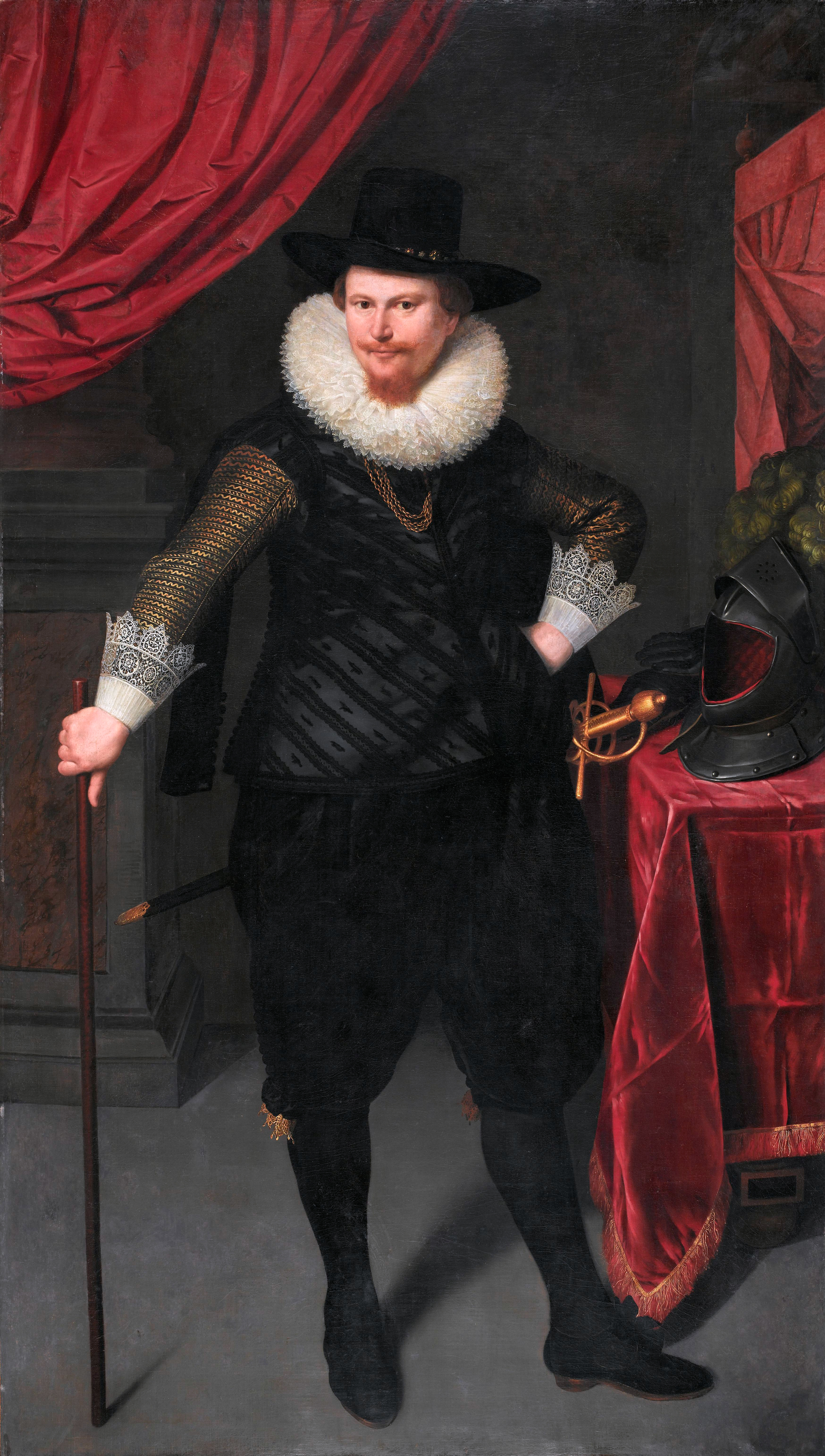
- Portrait by Cornelis van der Voort, 1620

3rd Governor-General of the East Indies
- In office 19 June 1616 – 21 March 1619
- Preceded by: Gerard Reynst
- Succeeded by: Jan Pieterszoon Coen

Personal details
- Born: 22 October 1583 Amsterdam, Dutch Republic
- Died: 21 October 1637 (aged 53) Amsterdam, Dutch Republic
- Employer: Dutch East India Company

Laurens Reael (22 October 1583 – 21 October 1637) was an employee of the Dutch East India Company, Governor-General of the Dutch East Indies from 1616 to 1619, and an admiral of the Dutch Republican Navy from 1625 to 1627.

== Early life ==
Laurens Reael was the son of Laurens Jacobsz Reael, a merchant in Amsterdam named after the sign or gable stone of his house/shop In den gouden Reael ("In the Golden Real") and an amateur poet known for writing Geuzenliederen (songs of the geuzen). The Amsterdam neighborhood Gouden Reael is named after Laurens Reael's birth house, via a later (1648) warehouse of the Reael family on the Zandhoek that turned into a popular inn. Laurens Jr. had academic talents, excelling in math and languages. He studied law in Leiden, where he lived in the house of Jacobus Arminius who had married his older sister Lijsbet Reael in 1590. Laurens received his doctorate in 1608.

== East Indies ==
In May 1611, he left as commandeur of four ships for the East Indies. He quickly worked his way up to become the third Governor-General in 1616, where he was stationed at the VOC headquarters, at that time on Ternate in the Moluccas. That year he could personally welcome both Joris van Spilbergen (30 March) and Schouten & Le Maire (12 September) upon their respective arrivals at Ternate from the Dutch Republic via the Strait of Magellan and Cape Horn. He was unaware that the VOC had ordered Schouten & Le Maire's ships to be confiscated for alleged infringement of its monopoly of trade to the Spice Islands.

Already after a year, on 31 October 1617, Reael resigned following a dispute with the VOC's leadership (the Lords XVII) on the treatment of both the English competitors in the Moluccas and of the native people. The jurist Reael would only take action against the English if international law would allow that and had protested repeatedly against the incursions against the natives. He, like the local admiral Steven van der Haghen, was of the opinion that the VOC's goals should be achieved solely via commercial and diplomatic routes. In his official report to the Staten Generaal and the VOC's Lords XVII upon his return to the Dutch Republic, he made these points again very clear.

It would take however until 21 March 1619, when the decidedly less pacifistic Jan Pieterszoon Coen would replace him as Governor-General, before which time Reael had fought the Spanish in 1617 in the Bay of Manila, the English at Bantam and in the Mollucas, and the Mataram Sultanate at Japara on Java.

== Later life in the Dutch Republic ==
Reael left the East Indies in January 1620 for Holland where for several years he focused on poetry, partially because his sympathies for the remonstrants (Arminius had been his brother in law after all) prevented him from holding public office. He acquainted, among others, the poets Pieter Cornelisz Hooft and Joost van den Vondel and became part of the Muiderkring. In 1623 Vondel dedicated his poem Lof der Zeevaart (Ode to Seafaring) to him.

After the death of Maurice of Nassau, Reael's standings were restored, and on 9 June 1625 he became a member of the Amsterdam Chamber of the VOC, which he would remain until the end of his life. From 1625 to 1627, he served as vice admiral of Holland and West-Friesland with the Amsterdam Admiralty, and he commanded a fleet of ships fighting the Spanish at the Barbary Coast alongside the English (the "second expedition to Spain" from 12 November 1626 to 10 July 1627). In 1626 he represented the Dutch Republic at the crowning of Charles I of England, who knighted him at the occasion. After 18 August 1627, he served as acting lieutenant admiral of Holland and West-Friesland, after the death of Lieutenant-Admiral Willem van Nassau.

At the end of 1627, he was sent as a diplomat to Denmark, which at that time was at war with Ferdinand II of Austria. On his way back early in 1628, he suffered a shipwreck of the coast of Jutland, where Austrian imperial troops happened to be camped. These captured him and sent him to Vienna, where he would remain imprisoned until February 1629. On his return he was not reinstated in his naval functions. In the summer of that year he married, and in 1630 he became councillor and in 1632 alderman (schepen) of the city of Amsterdam.

In 1637, he was considered for the function of Fleet Admiral of the confederate Dutch fleet to replace the incompetent Philips van Dorp, but in October, after losing his two young sons earlier in the year, he died of bubonic plague in Amsterdam. He was buried in Amsterdam in the Westerkerk.
