= Johan van der Keuken =

Dutch film director (1938–2001)

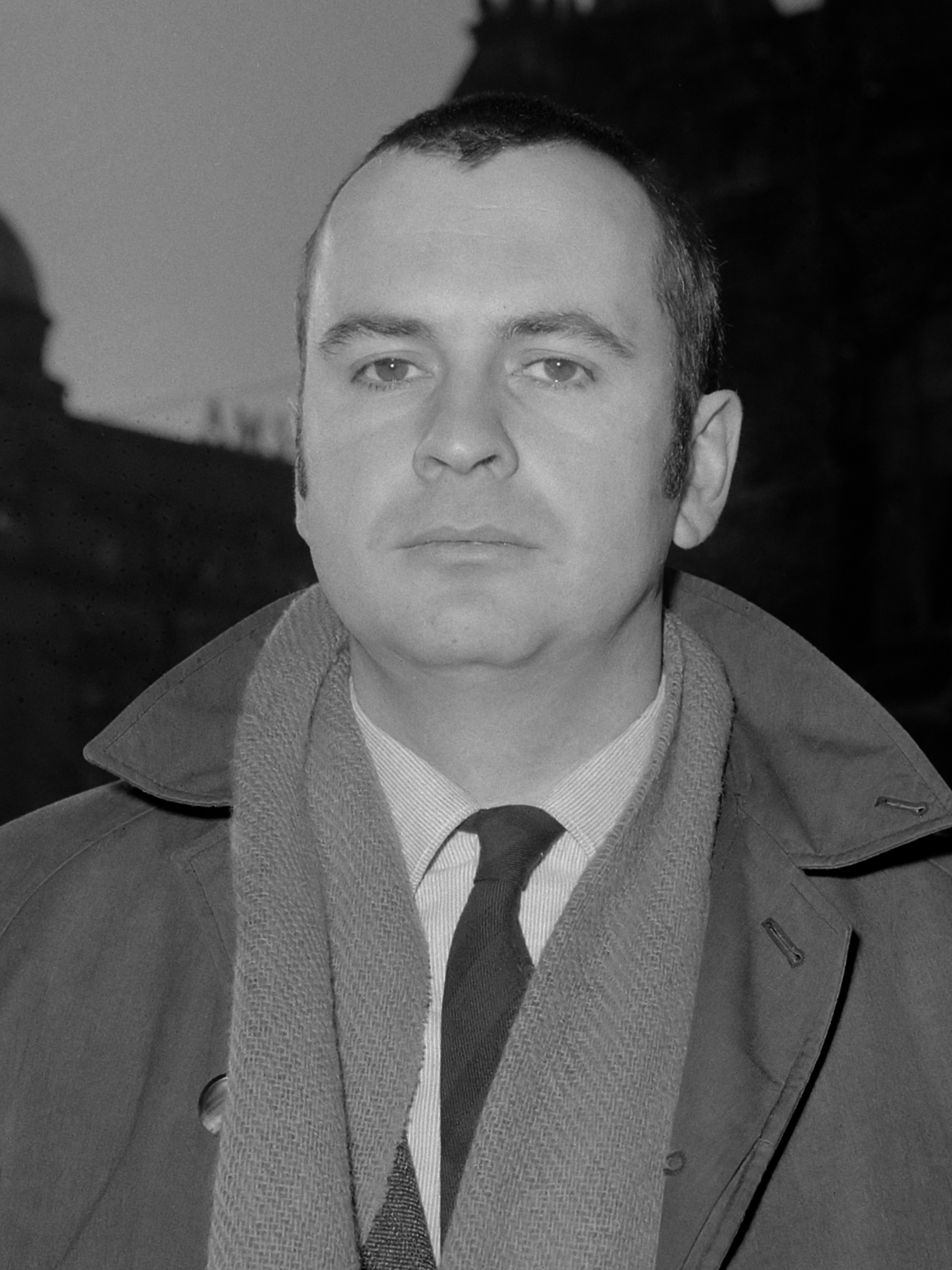
- Johan van der Keuken in 1965
- Born: 4 April 1938; Amsterdam, Netherlands
- Died: 7 January 2001 (aged 62); Amsterdam, Netherlands
- Occupations: Filmmaker, author, photographer

Johan van der Keuken (Dutch pronunciation: [ˈjoːɦɑɱ vɑn dər ˈkøːkə(n)]; 4 April 1938 – 7 January 2001) was a Dutch documentary filmmaker, author, and photographer. In a career that spanned 42 years, Van der Keuken produced 55 documentary films, six of which won eight awards. He also wrote nine books on photography and films, his field of interest. For all his efforts, he received seven awards for his life work, and one other for photography.

== Works ==
=== Documentary films ===
- 1957-1960: Produced the film Paris à l'Aube (10 min.), in collaboration with James Blue and Derry Hall.
- 1960: Produced the film Sunday (14 min.), using a "Prosper Dekeukeleire" camera.
- 1960-1963: Produced the film Even stilte/A Moment's Silence (10 min.).
- 1962: Produced four films on Dutch artists: (1) Yrrah (5 min.); (2) Tajiri (10 min.); (3) Opland (12 min.); and (4) Lucebert, Poet-Painter (16 min.).
- 1963: Produced the film The Old Lady (25 min.), using a "Prosper Dekeukeleire" camera.
- 1964: Produced two films, (1) Indonesian Boy (40 min.); and (2) Blind kind/Blind Child (24 min.).
- 1965: Produced two films, (1) Four Walls (22 min.); and (2) In the Nest with the Rest (8 min.). Co-produced Beppie (38 min.) with Ed van der Elsken on camera.
- 1966: Produced the film Herman Slobbe/Blind Child 2 (29 min.).
- 1967: Produced two films, (1) A Film for Lucebert (22 min.); and (2) Big Ben/Ben Webster in Europe (32 min.).
- 1968: Produced three films, (1) The Spirit of the Time (42 min.); (2) The Cat (5 min.); and (3) The Street is Free (7 min.); was cameraman for Louis van Gasteren's Report from Biafra.
- 1970: Produced two films, (1) Velocity: 40-70 (25 min.), using a "Mat van Hensbergen" camera; and (2) Beauty (25 min.). In addition, was cameraman for Roeland Kerbosch's Libya in the Rush of Revolution.
- 1972: Produced the film Diary (80 min.), North-South Triptych, Part 1.
- 1973: Produced five films, (1) Bert Schierbeek/The Door (11 min.); (2) Het witte kasteel/The White Castle (78 min.), North-South Triptych, Part 2, in collaboration with Bert Schierbeek; (3) Vietnam Opera (11 min.); (4) De muur/The Wall (9 min.); and (5) Het leesplankje/The Reading Lesson (10 min.).
- 1974: Produced two films, (1) De nieuwe kasteel/The New Ice Age (80 min.), North-South Triptych', Part 3; and (2) Filmmaker's Holiday (38 min.).
- 1975: Produced two films, (1) The Palestinians (45 min.); and (2) Springtime (80 min.).
- 1977: Produced the film Maarten and the Double Bass (30 min.).
- 1978: Produced the award-winning film De platte jungle/Flat Jungle (90 min.).
- 1980: Produced the film The Master and the Giant (70 min.) in collaboration with Claude Ménard; was cameraman for Babeth Vanloo's Joseph Beuys at the Rotterdam Museum.
- 1980-1981: Produced the film The Way South/De weg naar het zuiden (143 min.).
- 1982: Produced the film De beeldenstorm/Iconoclasm/A Storm of Images (85 min.).
- 1984: Produced two films, (1) Time (45 min.); and (2) Toys (4 min.).
- 1986: Produced three films, (1) the award-winning I love $ (145 min.); (2) Wet Feet in Hong Kong (5 min.); and (3) The Unanswered Question (18 min.), using a "Melle van Essen and Niels van 't Hoff" camera.
- 1988: Produced the award-winning film Het Oog Boven de Put/The Eye Above the Well (90 min.).
- 1989: Was cameraman for Noshka van der Lely's The Mountain World Non-World.
- 1989-1990: Produced the film The Mask (55 min.).
- 1990-1991: Produced the award-winning film Face Value (120 min.).
- 1992-1993: Produced the film Brass Unbound (106 min.) in collaboration with Rob Boonzajer Flaes.
- 1993: Produced the film Sarajevo Film Festival (14 min.).
- 1994: Produced three films, (1) Tony's birthday (9 min.); (2) the award-winning Lucebert: tijd en afscheid/Lucebert: Time and Farewell (52 min.); and (3) On Animal Locomotion (15 min.), in collaboration with Willem Breuker.
- 1996: Produced the film Amsterdam Global Village (245 min.).
- 1997: Produced two films, (1) Amsterdam Afterbeat (16 min.); and (2) To Sang Fotostudio (35 min.). During the filming of the latter, van der Keuken was himself the subject of a documentary film Leven Met Je Ogen/Living with Your Eyes.
- 1998: Produced the film Last Words - My Sister Yoka (1935-1997)/Laatste woorden: Mijn zusje Joke (1935-1997) (50 min.).
- 2000: Produced two films, (1) De grote vakantie/The Long Holiday (145 min.); and (2) Temps/Travail (10 min.).
- 2001: Produced the film For The Time Being (10 min).
- 2002: Onvoltooid tegenwoordig (The Present) opens at the International Film Festival Rotterdam 2002.

=== Exhibitions ===
- 1957-1960: Hosted photo-exhibitions in Amsterdam, Paris, Milan, Biella, and Roubaix.
- 1965-1966: Hosted photo-exhibitions at various museums in the Netherlands.
- 1964: Hosted a photo-exhibition on Sardegna in Amsterdam.
- 1980: Hosted a photo-exhibition, Photography 1955-1980, at the Stedelijk Museum, Amsterdam.
- 1981: Hosted Brother Kodak (is watching you), a projection of 70 photographs in the traveling exhibition, No Comment.
- 1987: Hosted photo-exhibition, Photographs 1953-1986, at Centre Georges Pompidou, Paris, France.
- 1988: Hosted photo-exhibition, Photographs 1953-1988, at Centraal Museum, Utrecht, Netherlands.
- 1993: Hosted photo-exhibition, Johan van der Keuken: Photographer and Filmmaker, at the Amsterdam Historical Museum.
- 1997: Hosted photo-exhibition, Body and City, Part One: A Day in La Paz, at the Stedelijk Museum, Amsterdam.
- 1998: Hosted exhibitions/installations/films, Body and City, at (1) De Balie, Amsterdam; (ii) Maison Européenne de la Photographie, Paris; (iv) Institut Néerlandais, Paris; (v) Maison de l'Amerique Latine, Paris; (vi) Galerie Nationale du Jeu de Paume, Paris; and (vii) Le Fresnoy National Studio of Performing Arts, (Tourcoing), France.
- 1999: Hosted photo-exhibitions, (1) One Eye at the Camera, The Other of the World: Photographs and Films Exhibition at the Berkeley Art Museum at University of California, Berkeley, and (2) Body and City in New York City; Hosted exhibitions/installations/films at (1) Viennale Film Festival, Vienna; (2) Centre de Cultura Contemporània de Barcelona, Spain; and; (3) VOX Centre, Montreal, Quebec, Canada.
- 2000: Hosted (1) two video-installation in the exhibition, Le Temps, Vite at Centre Georges Pompidou, Paris; and (2) Temps/Travail at Boymans-van Beuningen Museum, Rotterdam, Netherlands.
- 2001: (1) Lichaam & Stad: three parts at the Wexner Center for the Arts, Columbus, Ohio, USA; (2) Bolivia en Temps/Travail, November/December 2001, IDFA, Arti et Amicitiae, Amsterdam, Netherlands.

=== Film retrospectives ===
- 1975: At the Cinémathèque québécoise, Montreal, Quebec, Canada.
- 1978: At the Pacific Film Archive, Berkeley, California.
- 1980: At the Film Museum, Munich, Germany.
- 1987: At Cinémathèque française Central, Paris, France.
- 1988: At the European Documentary Film Festival, Marseilles, France.
- 1991: Hosted the 1953-1991 film retrospective at Cinemateca Portuguesa, Lisbon, Portugal.
- 1999: At (1) French Institute, Athens, Greece; (2) 'E Tudo Verdade' Film Festival, São Paulo and Rio de Janeiro, Brazil; (3) San Francisco International Film Festival, California; (4) San Francisco Cinemathèque, California; (5) Pacific Film Archive, Berkeley, California; (6) Kino Arsenal at the Arsenal Institute for Film and Video Art in Berlin, Germany; and (7) Xenix Filmclub Zürich, Switzerland; (8) Filmmaker Festival, Milan, Italy.
- 2000: At (1) the Centre Georges Pompidou, Paris, France; (2) Spoutnik Cinéma Geneva, Switzerland; (3) Barcelona Cinematheque, Madrid, Spain; (4) Cinemateca Espanola, Madrid, Spain; and (5) Cinematheque Ontario, Toronto, Ontario, Canada.
- 2001: At (1) Museum of Modern Art; and (2) the Harvard Film Archive.
- 2003: At Encuentros del Otro Cine, Documentary Film Festival, Ecuador.
- 2018: At the Centre Pompidou, Paris, France.

=== Books of photographs ===
- 1955: Wij zijn 17 (We are 17), a book of photographs of postwar Dutch youth taken by Van der Keuken when he was seventeen years old.
- 1957: Achter Glas (Behind Glass), the text of which was written by Remco Campert.
- 1963: Paris Mortel (Mortal Paris).
- 1980: Zien kijken filmen (Seeing, Watching, Filming, ISBN 90-6012-458-8), a book of photographs, writings on film, and interviews in Amsterdam.
- 1987: Abenteuer eines Auges (Adventures of an Eye), a book of photographs, writings on film and interviews at Hamburg, Germany.
- 1991: After Image/Nabeeld (ISBN 9065790128).
- 1998: Aventures d'un regard (Adventures of a Gaze, ISBN 2-86642-221-X), a book of photographs, films, writings and interviews, edited in collaboration with François Albéra, Cahiers du Cinéma, Paris, France.
- 2000: L’Œil lucide/The Lucid Eye (ISBN 9074159311).
- 2001: Bewogen Beelden (Moving Images, ISBN 90-445-0168-2).
- 2010: Quatorze Juillet (July Fourteenth, ISBN 978-90-72532-09-1). This contains 32 photographs shot on Bastille Day in Paris in 1958 around the same time as a famous photograph from Paris Mortel of a couple dancing in the street.

=== Miscellaneous ===
- 1982: Hosted first film concert with The Willem Breuker Collective in the series, Willem Breuker meets Johan van der Keuken.
- 1987: Was honorary guest at the Flaherty Film Seminar, Ithaca, New York, United States.
- 1997: Conducted a lecture and presentation on Film on Films, with François Albéra, Documenta X, Kassel, Germany.
- 1999: Was honorary guest at the Flaherty Film Seminar in North Carolina, and Museum of Modern Art, New York, USA.

== Awards ==
- 1978: Josef von Sternberg Prize, Mannheim, Germany, for the film Flat Jungle (90 min.).
- 1986: Josef von Sternberg Prize, Mannheim, Germany, for the film I love $ (145 min.).
- 1988: Grand Prix, Brussels Film Festival, Belgium, for the film The Eye Above the Well (90 min.).
- 1988: (1) the Dutch Cultural Award for his lifetime work; and (2) the Dutch Photography Award.
- 1990-1991: Dutch Press Prize, Netherlands, for the film Face Value (120 min.).
- 1994: Grand Prix, 5e Biennale Internationale du Film sur l'Art, Paris, France, for the film Lucebert, Time and Farewell (52 min.).
- 1996: (1) the Grolsch Prize at the Dutch Film Festival, Netherlands; (2) first prize at the Munich Festival, Germany; and (3) Award of the Art House Cinemas, France, for the film Amsterdam Global Village.
- 1999: Golden Gate Persistence of Vision Award for his lifetime work at the San Francisco International Film Festival, California, USA.
- 2000: (1) Silver Spire Award, San Francisco International Film Festival; (2) Forum of New Cinema prize, Berlin International Film Festival, Germany; (3) Grand Prix UBS at Visions du Réel for De grote vakantie/The Long Holiday; (4) special honorary award at the Documentary Filmfestival, Thessaloniki, Greece; and (5) Bert Haanstra Award 2000, Amsterdam, Netherlands, for lifetime achievement.
