= Haarlemmerbuurt =

Coordinates: 52.381703°N 4.888852°E

- Neighbourhood of Amsterdam
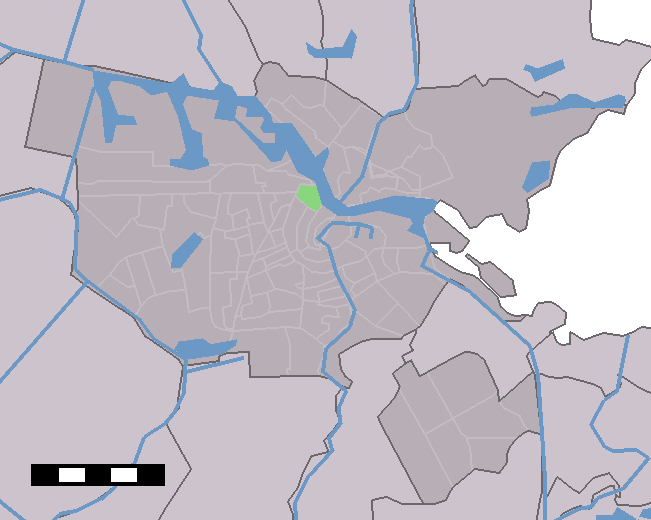
- Country: Netherlands
- Province: North Holland
- COROP: Amsterdam
- Borough: Centrum
- Time zone: UTC+1 (CET)

Haarlemmerbuurt is a neighbourhood in Amsterdam, in the Dutch province of North Holland, and is part of the borough Centrum. The central artery of the area is formed by the streets Haarlemmerdijk and Haarlemmerstraat, the old road to Haarlem. The neighbourhood is bordered to the south by Brouwersgracht, to the west by Singelgracht, on the north by the railway embankment and on the east by the Singel.

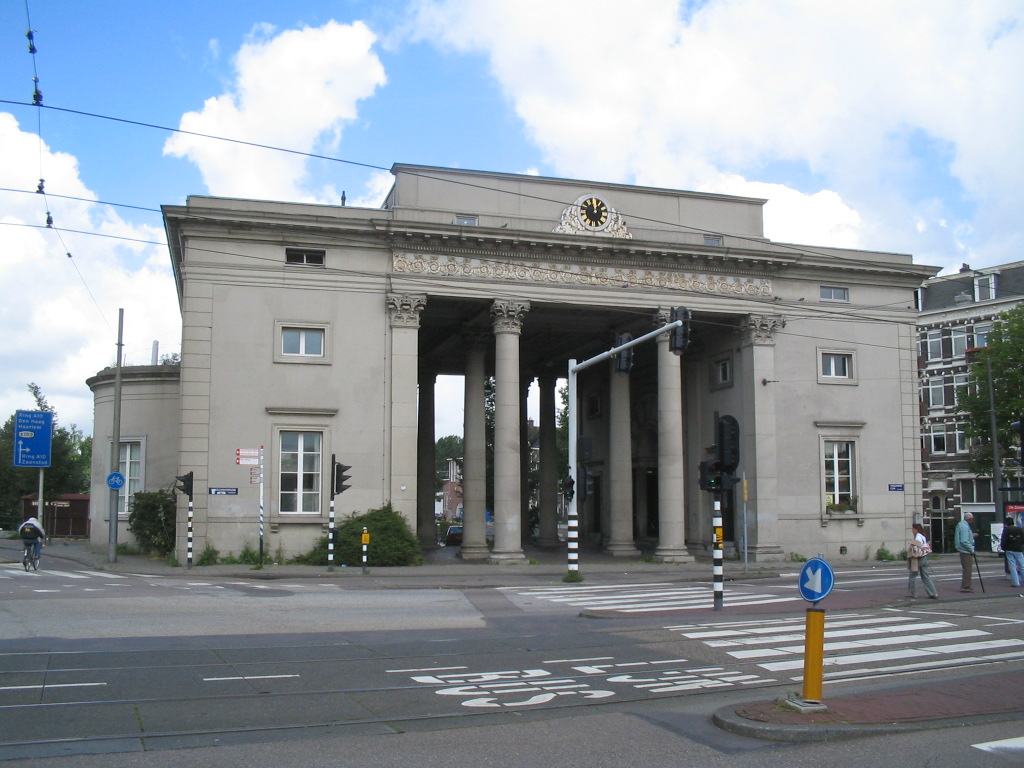
Haarlemmerpoort in 2005

Haarlemmerplein, with the Haarlemmerpoort or Willemspoort city gate, is a square located at the western end of the neighbourhood. On the north side there used to be a timber storage area, which is why this part is called Haarlemmer Houttuinen (Haarlemmer Timberyards). With the construction of the railway line between Singelgracht and Central Station through the Haarlemmer Houttuinen in 1878 this became the northern boundary.

In the 1970s, a traffic thoroughfare was built alongside the railway, for which a large part of the Haarlemmer Houttuinen and part of the buildings on the north facade of Haarlemmerplein were demolished. This caused the square to lose its cohesion. Since a new block on the north facade was finished in 2012, the square is once again complete.

The West-Indisch Huis (West India House) is located at Haarlemmerstraat 75, and is the former headquarters of the Dutch West India Company. The Posthoornkerk, a church by architect Pierre Cuypers, is located further down the street at numbers 124-126.

Haarlemmerstraat and Haarlemmerdijk are known for the great quality and diversity of their shops, boutiques and restaurants, and were voted "best shopping street of The Netherlands" in 2011. There are also a couple of coffeeshops located on Haarlemmerstraat.
