= Jan Sierhuis =

Dutch painter (1928–2023)

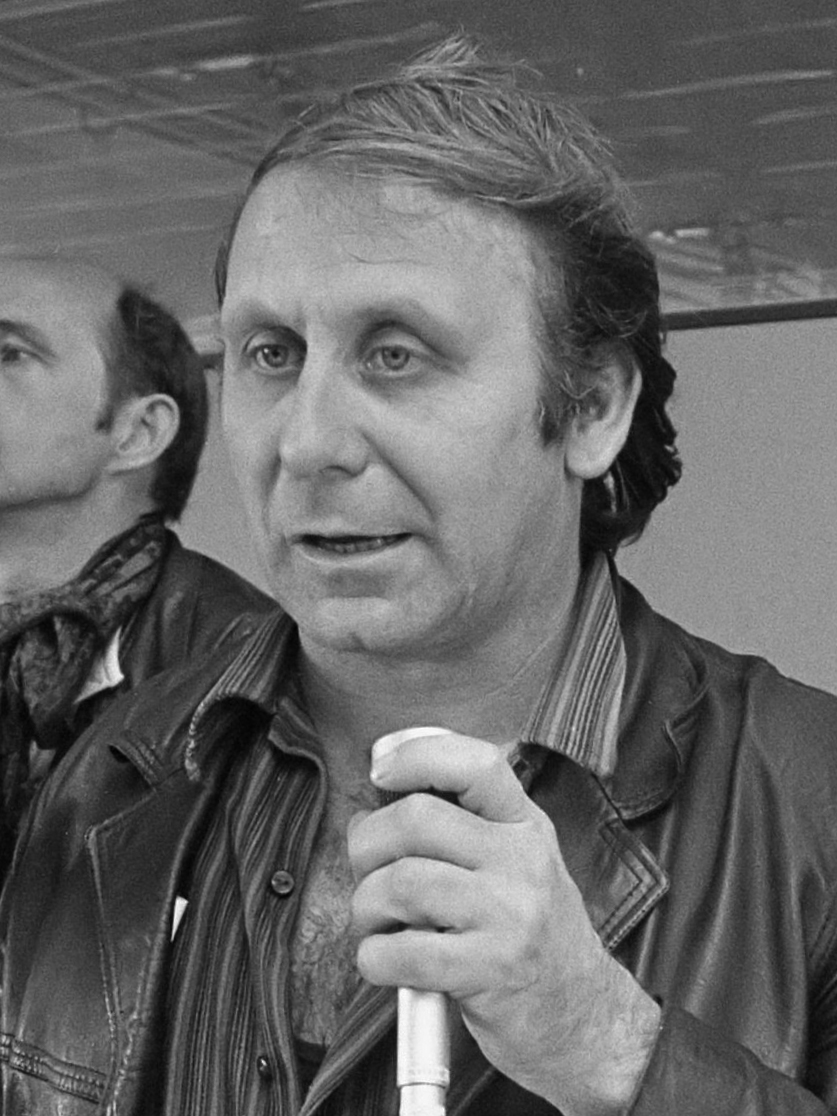
- Sierhuis speaking at a meeting in 1969
- Born: Johannes Alphonsus Sierhuis; 21 December 1928; Amsterdam, Netherlands
- Died: 4 July 2023 (aged 94); Amsterdam, Netherlands
- Style: Expressionism
- Awards: Royal prize for painting 1956
- Website: jansierhuis.info

Jan Sierhuis (21 December 1928 – 4 July 2023) was a Dutch expressionist painter.

Sierhuis died on 4 July 2023, at the age of 94.
