= Prinseneilandsgracht =

Canal in Amsterdam

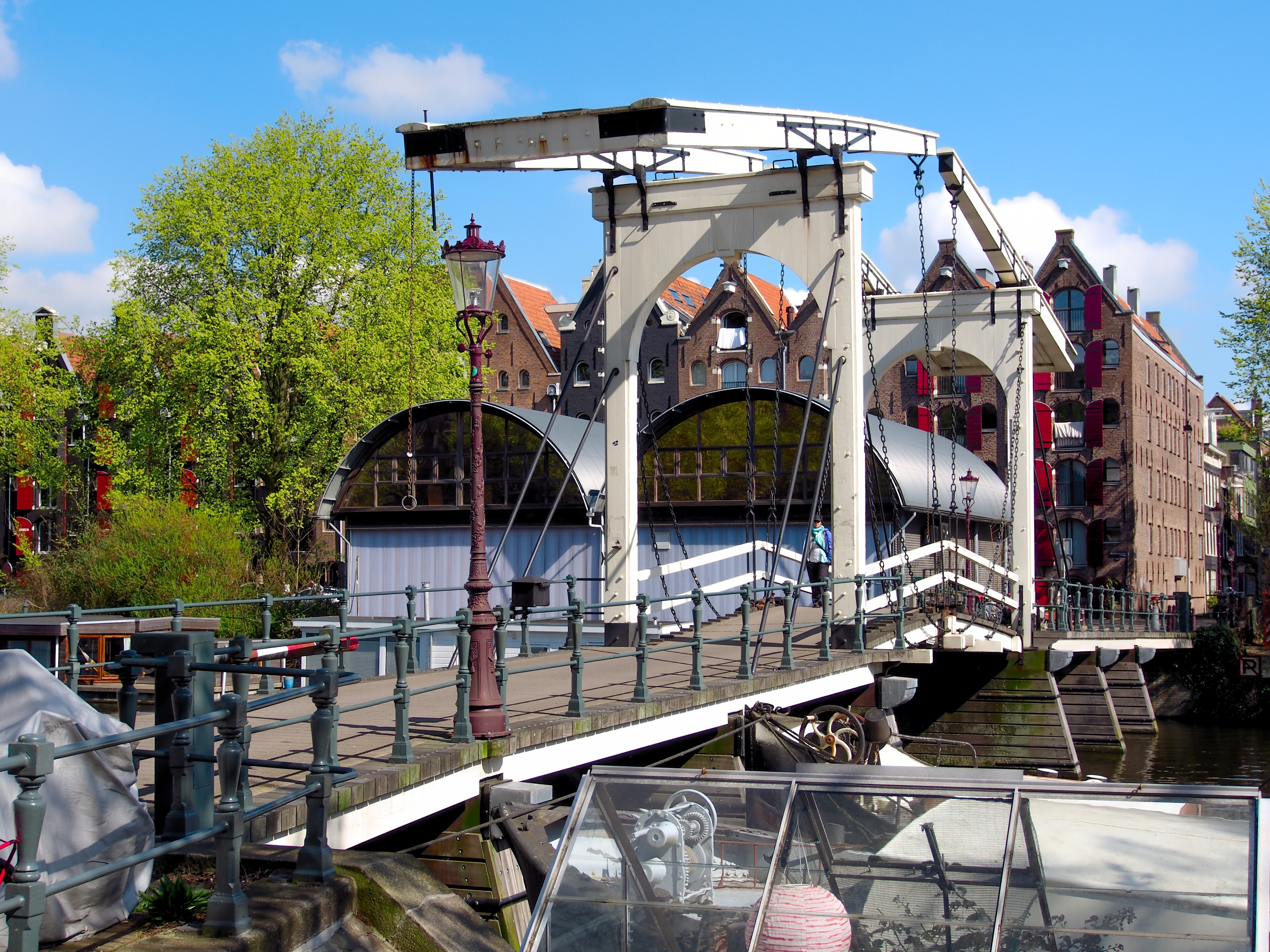
- Bridge 321 (Sloterdijkerbrug) over Prinseneilandsgracht

- Location within Amsterdam
- Location: Amsterdam
- Postal code: 1013
- Coordinates: 52.385761°N 4.885921°E
- South end: Eilandsgracht
- To: Realengracht / Smallepadsgracht

The Prinseneilandsgracht is a canal in the Centrum district of Amsterdam. It runs between Prinseneiland, an artificial island, to the east and the mainland to the west. Until after World War II (1939–45) the canal was bordered almost exclusively by warehouses and factories.

== Location ==
The Prinseneilandsgracht defines the western boundary of Prinseneiland, one of the three artificial islands that make up the Westelijke Eilanden (Western Islands). It connects the Eilandsgracht to the south with the Realengracht and Smallepadsgracht to the north. It is crossed by the Sloterdijkerbrug (bridge no. 321), which carries Galgenstraat from the island across to Nieuwe Teertuinen on the mainland, from where it continues as Sloterdijkstraat.

== History ==
During the third expansion of 1610–15 port capacity was increased by building the Nieuwe Waal to the west of the city. The Nieuwe Waal was only deep enough for ships at a considerable distance from the Haarlemmerdijk sea wall, so the shallower area closer to shore was used for three artificial islands. The Western Islands are three large artificial islands that were built between 1611 and 1615 in the swampy western corner of the IJ. The new islands were made of soil that was mostly dug up rather than dredged up. After a dispute with land speculators, building plots on Prinseneiland began in 1623.

The Sloterdijkerbrug, a bridge, was built over the Prinseneilandsgracht to give access to Nieuwe Teertuinen. In 1643 the tar works moved from Oude Teertuinen to both sides of Prinseneilandsgracht. Hardly anyone lived on Prinseneiland until after World War II. Of the 900 warehouses in Amsterdam, more than one hundred were on Prinseneiland.

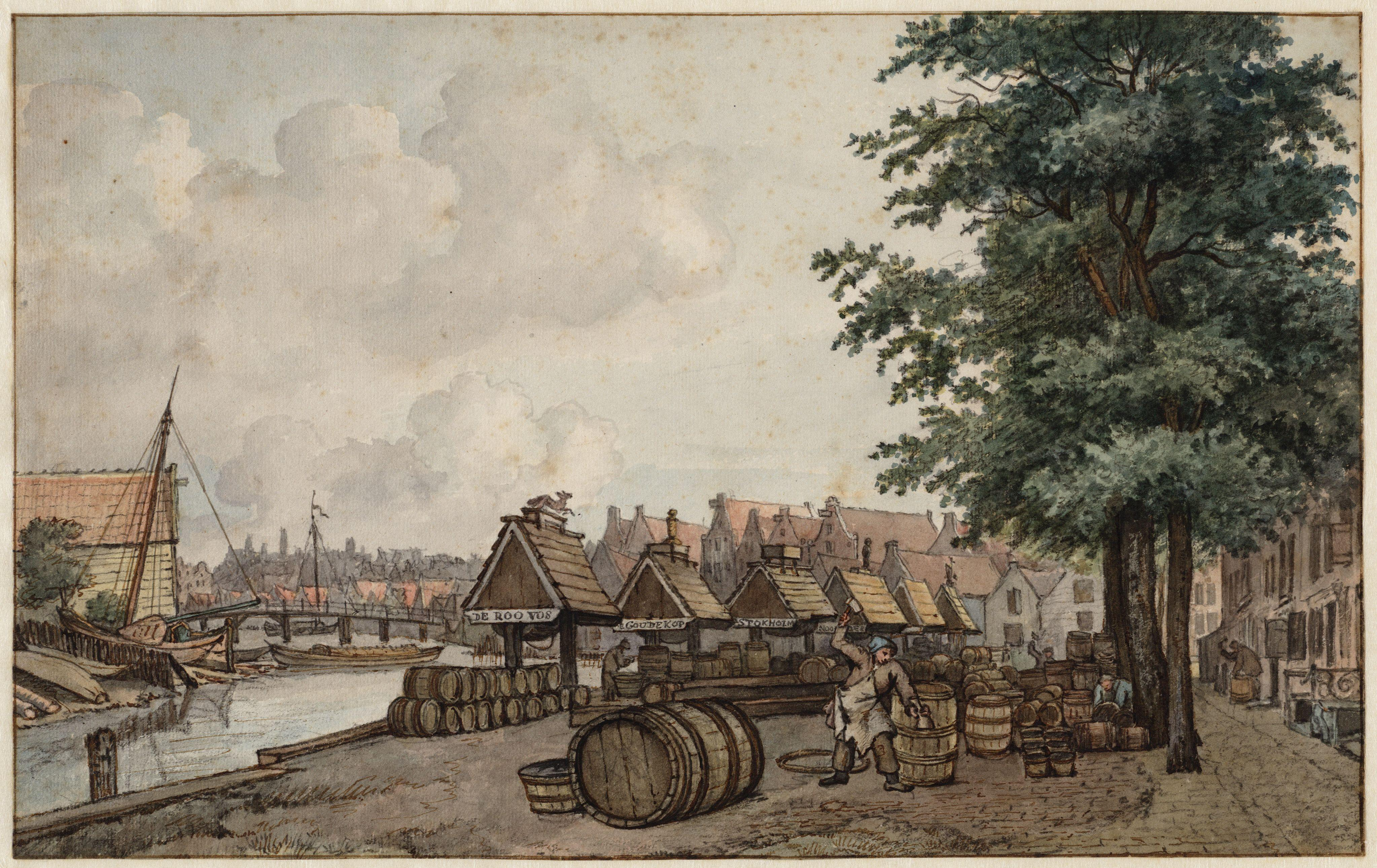
Nieuwe Teertuinen with the Sloterdijkerbrug on the left over the Prinseneilandsgracht. Gerrit Lamberts 1816

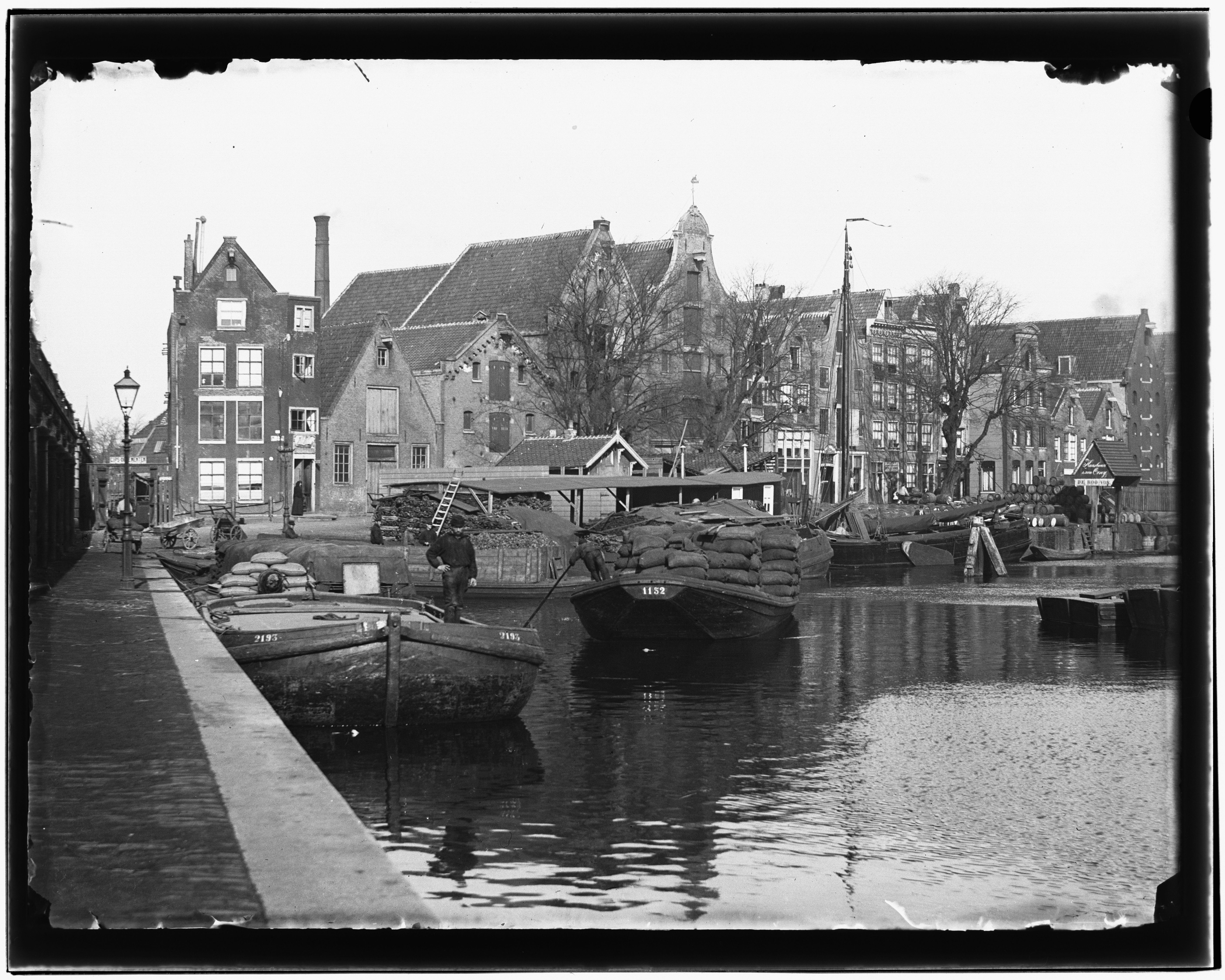
Nieuwe Teertuinen 13 to 33 seen across Prinseneilandsgracht. Jacob Olie 1893

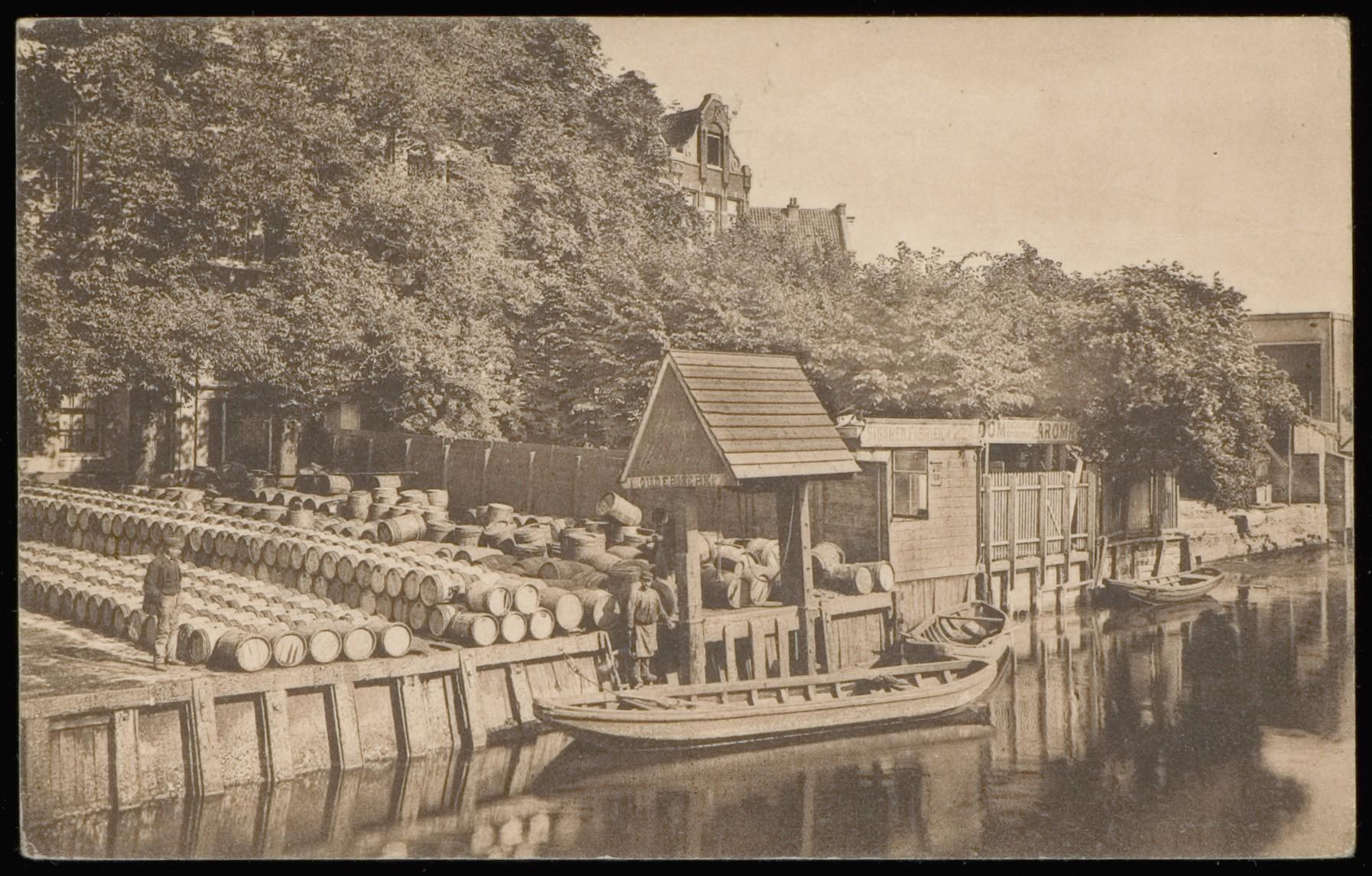
Prinseneiland seen from bridge 321 to the south-east. On the right the Prinseneilandsgracht. c. 1900

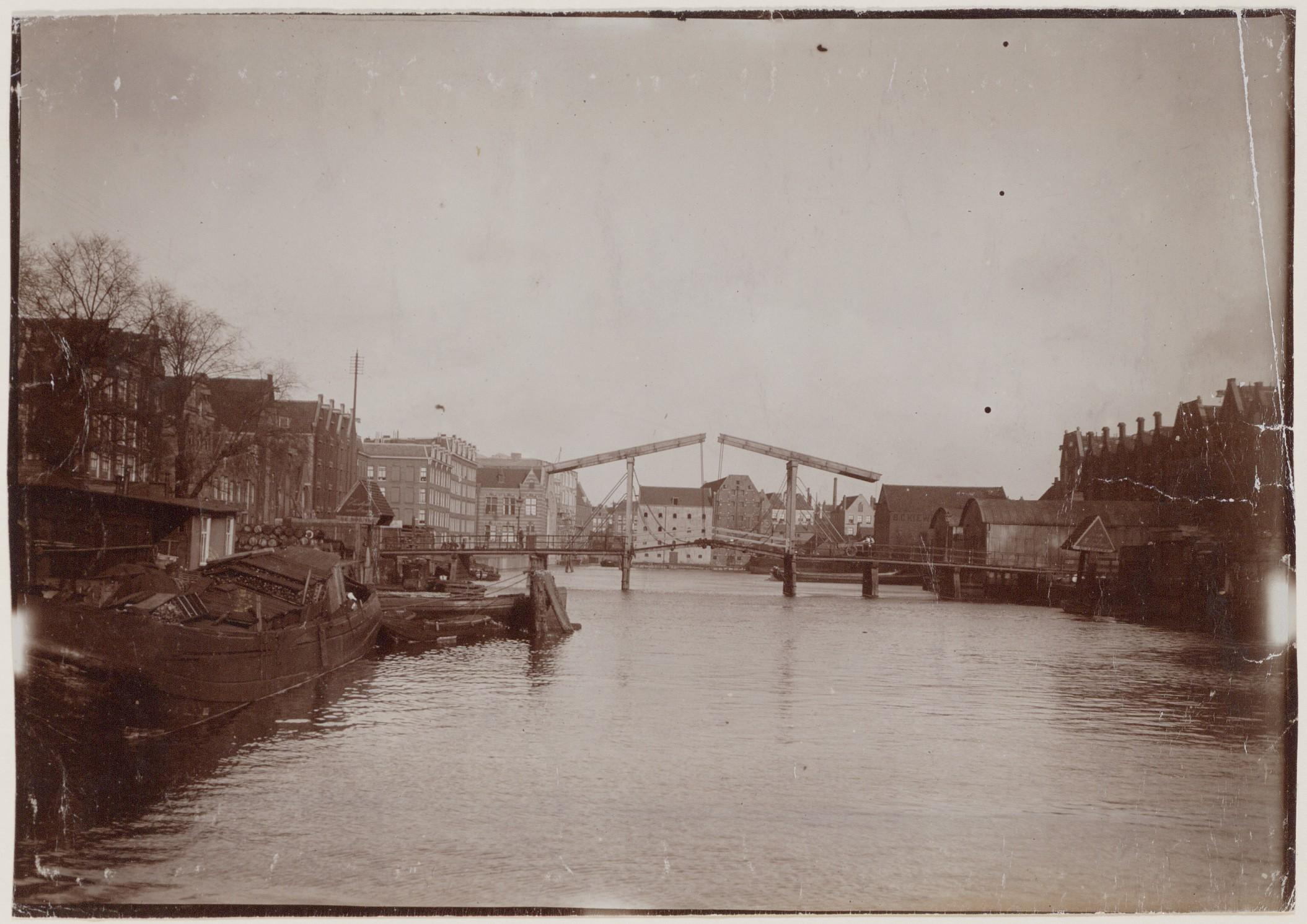
Prinseneilandsgracht seen towards the Sloterdijkerbrug (bridge no. 321) and Realengracht.

== See also ==
- Canals of Amsterdam

== Sources ==
- Theo Bakker, Westelijke Eilanden: Bickerseiland, Prinseneiland, Realeneiland (PDF)
- Tjalk Rensiena, De erfgoed ensemblewaarde; ofwel het schip in relatie met de omgeving waarin het meestal ligt
