= Eilandsgracht =

Canal in Amsterdam

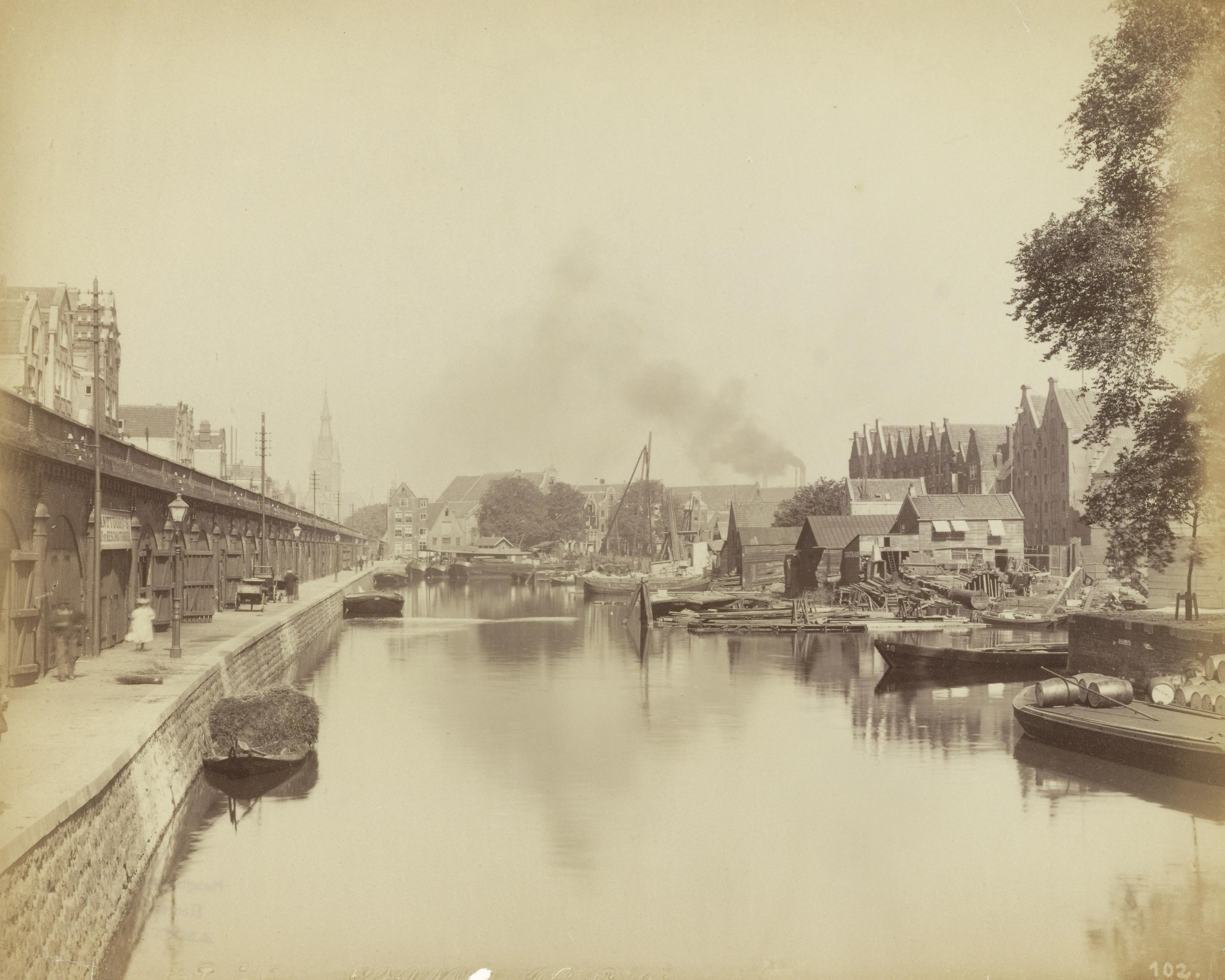
- Eilandsgracht towards the Nieuwe Teertuinen c.1900

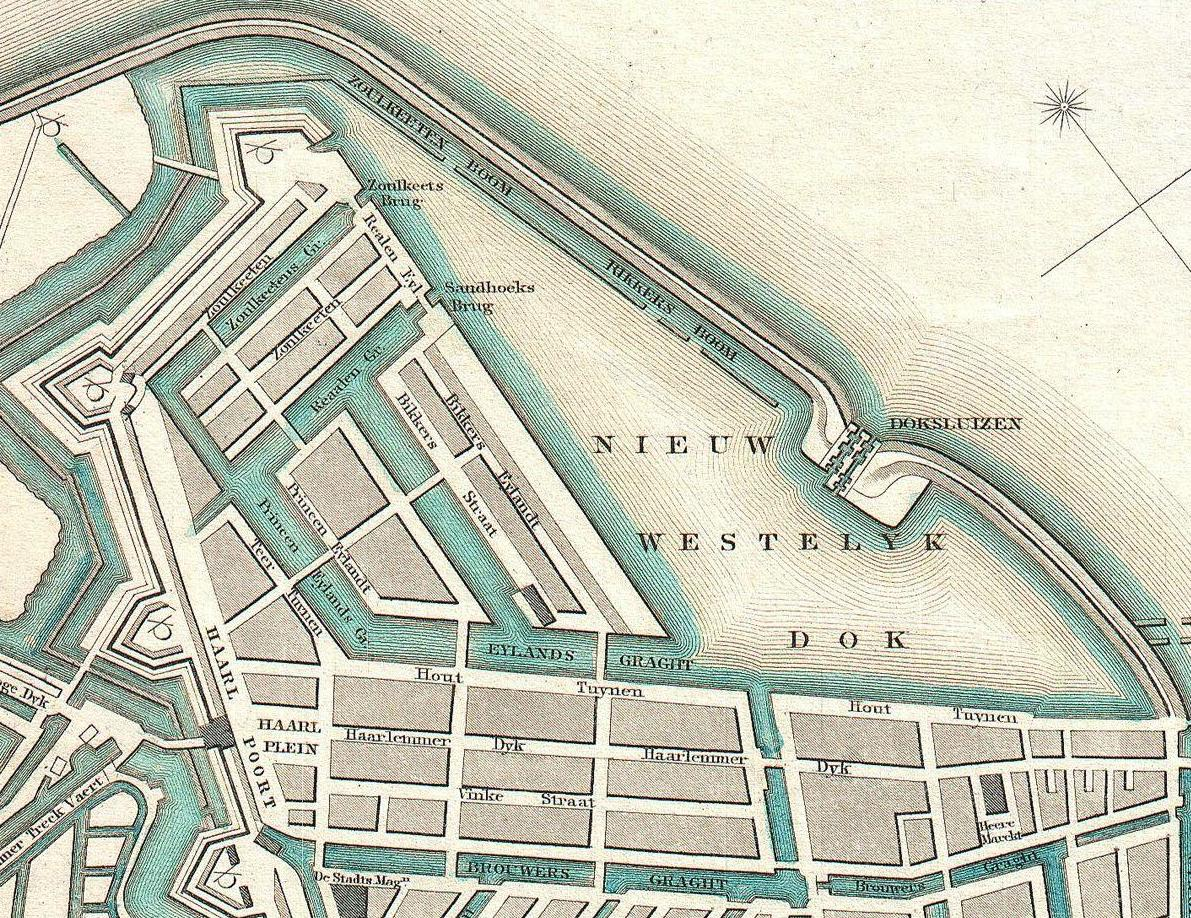
- Western Docks in 1835. Eilandsgracht leads northwest from the southwest of the dock.
- Location: Amsterdam
- Postal code: 1016
- Coordinates: 52.384503°N 4.886831°E

The Eilandsgracht (Dutch pronunciation: [ˈɛilɑntsˌxrɑxt]) is a canal in Amsterdam between the Westelijke Eilanden (Western Islands) and the mainland. It originally ran between the mainland and two of the islands, Prinseneiland and Bickerseiland. In 1928 the section along Bickerseiland was filled in.

== Location ==
The Eilandsgracht forms the southwest boundary of Prinseneiland, and connects Prinseneilandsgracht to the west of Prinseneiland with Bickersgracht to the east of Prinseneiland. These two canals join Realengracht to the north of Prinseneiland. The road on the southwest (mainland) side of the canal is named Lange Eilandsgracht. On the northeast (Prinseneiland) side, the canal is bordered by the backs of buildings on the Prinseneiland road, which rings the island.

== History ==
During the third expansion of 1610–15 port capacity was increased by building the Nieuwe Waal to the west of the city. The Nieuwe Waal was only deep enough for ships at a considerable distance from the Haarlemmerdijk sea wall, so the shallower area closer to shore was used for three artificial islands. The Western Islands are three large artificial islands that were built between 1611 and 1615 in the swampy western corner of the IJ. The new islands were made of soil that was mostly dug up rather than dredged up. In the early days Bickersailand was connected to Middeleiland (Prinseneiland) by the Galgenbrug over the Bickersgracht, and to the mainland by the Eilandsbrug over the Eilandsgracht to the Haarlemmerdijk. After a dispute with land speculators, building plots on Prinseneiland began in 1623.

In 1877–79 the railway line from Haarlemmerpoort station was extended to the auxiliary station at the Droogbak and in 1889 to the new Central Station. Before construction of the railroad started, in 1872 the Eilandsgracht was partially filled in. A rail viaduct was built half on the Houttuinen and half on the filled in side of the canal. In 1918 it was decided to double the tracks, taking another strip of the Eilandsgracht. So little remained between Bickerseiland and the mainland that in 1928 it was completely filled in.

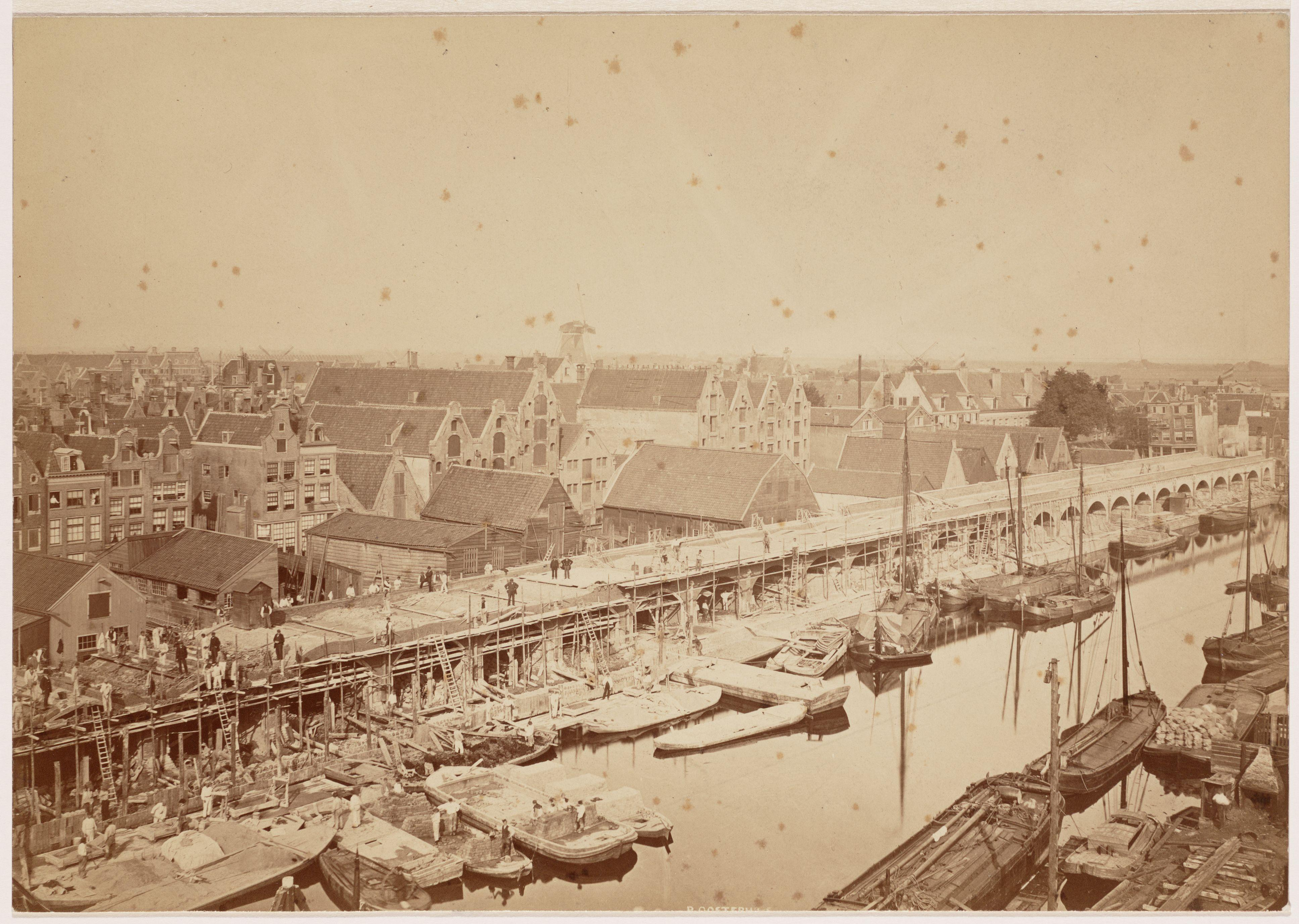
Construction of the railway embankment along Eilandsgracht (1872)

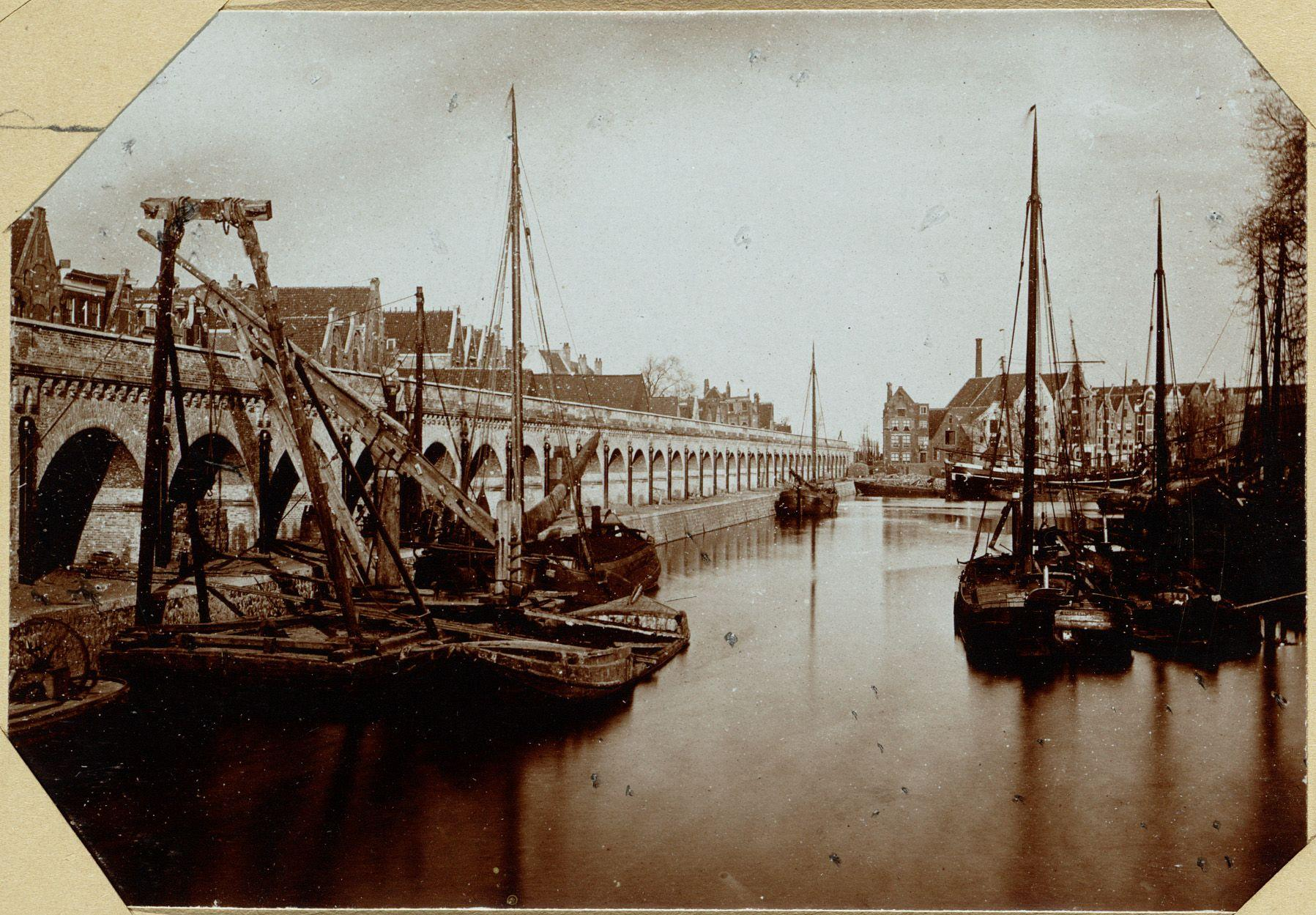
Railroad Viaduct, along Bickers Island. On the left the roofs of the Haarlemmer Houttuinen.

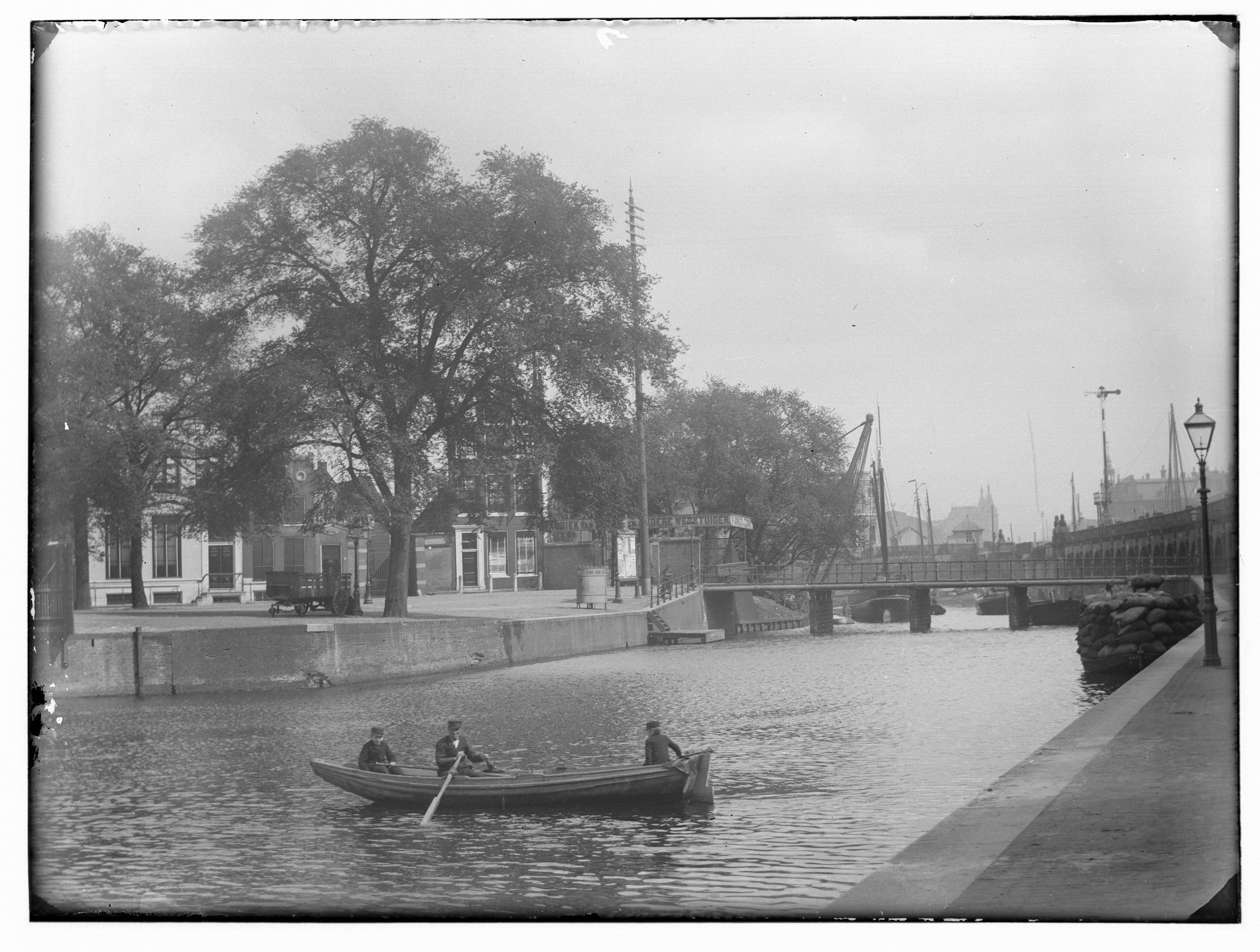
Left: Bickersplein, later Hendrik Jonkerplein. Right: bridge no. 312 over Eilandsgracht. Jacob Olie (1890)

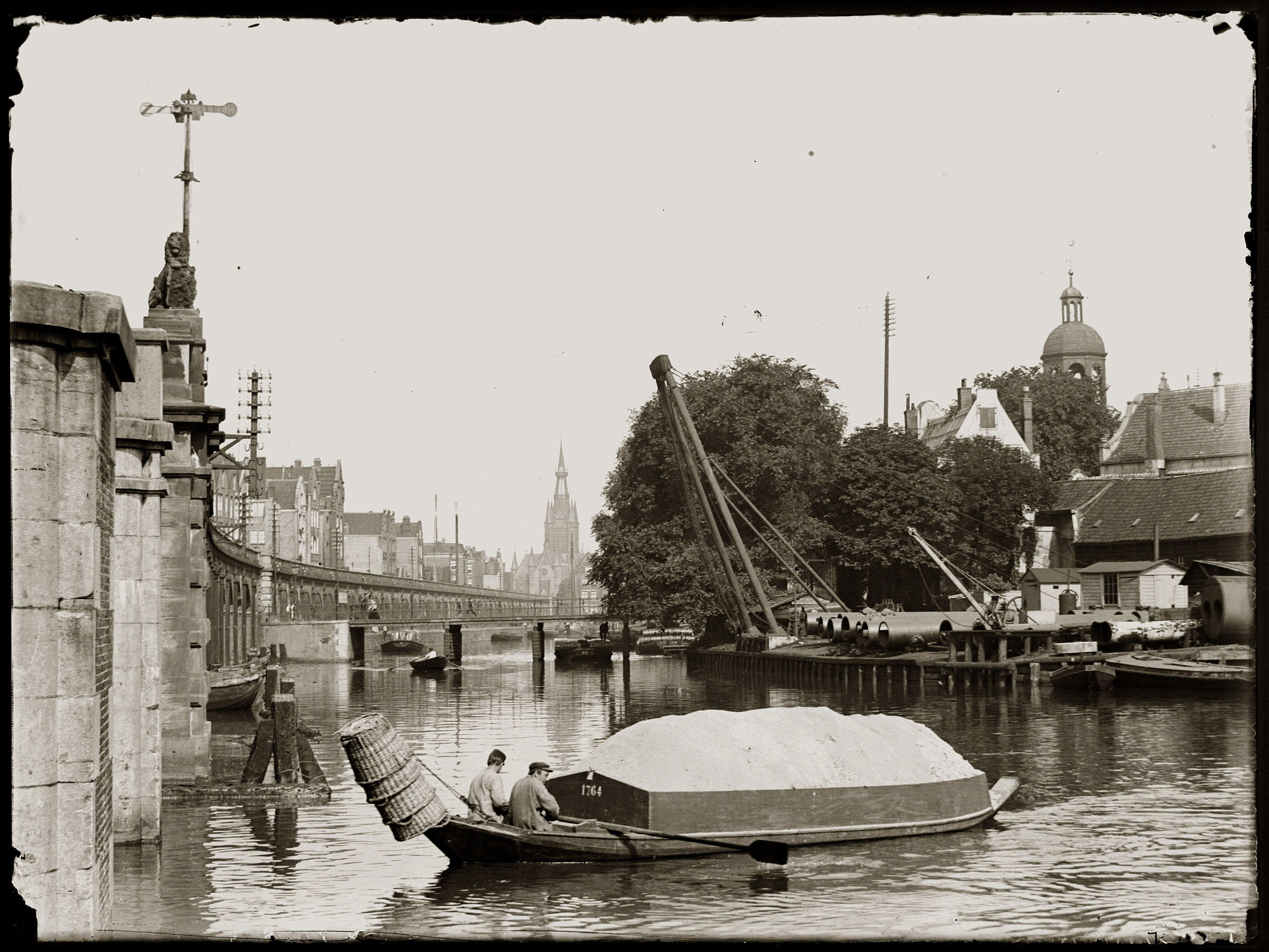
The viaduct between Westerdok and Korte Prinsengracht (1899). Right: Bickersplein, turret of the Eilandskerk.

== See also ==
- Canals of Amsterdam

== Sources ==
- Theo Bakker, Westelijke Eilanden: Bickerseiland, Prinseneiland, Realeneiland (PDF)
- Tjalk Rensiena, De erfgoed ensemblewaarde; ofwel het schip in relatie met de omgeving waarin het meestal ligt
