= Zoutkeetsgracht =

Canal in Amsterdam

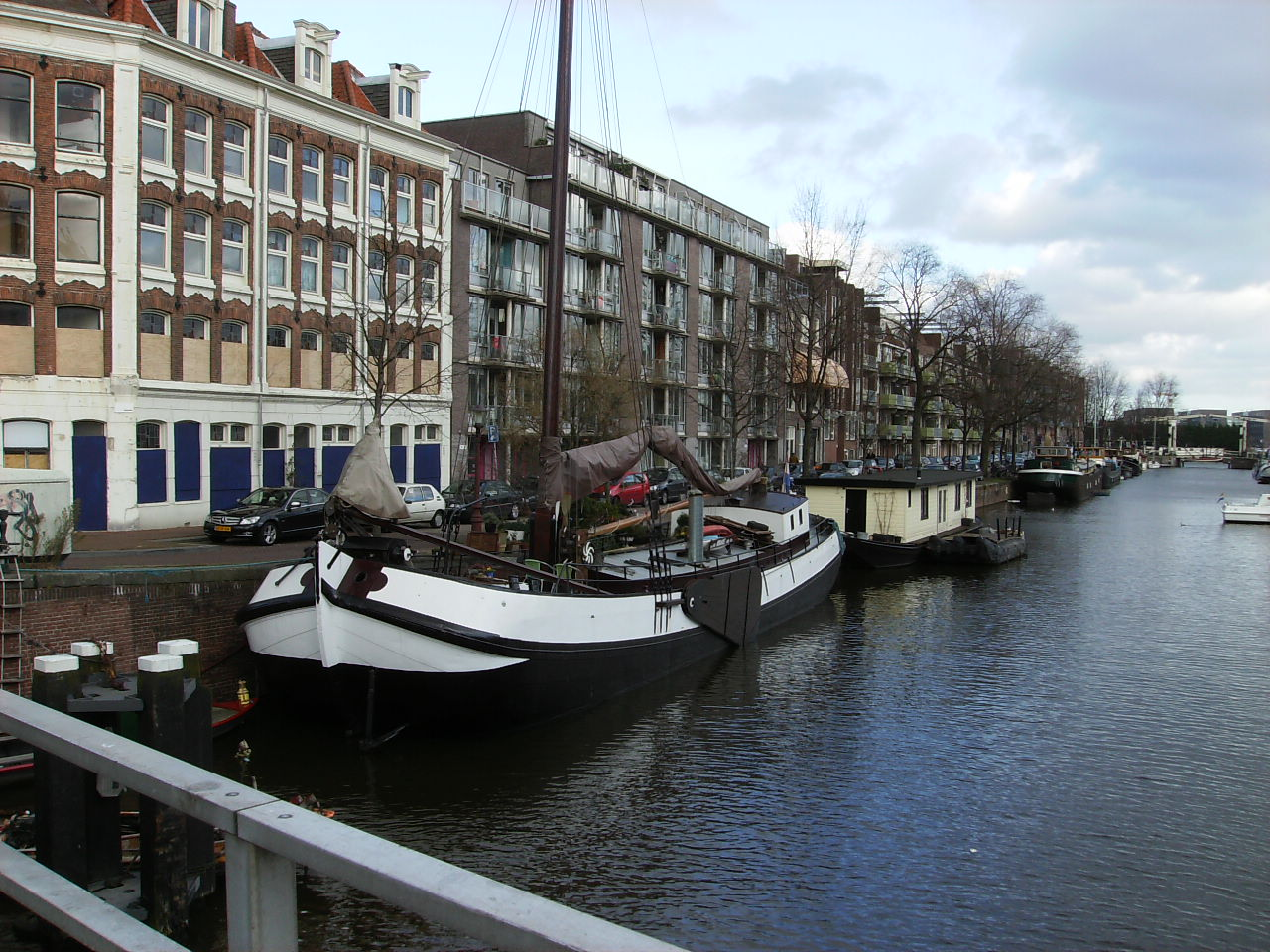
- View from the Zoutkeetsbrug (Bridge 318) over the Zoutkeetsgracht
- Interactive map of Zoutkeetsgracht
- Location: Amsterdam
- Postal code: 1013
- Coordinates: 52.388333°N 4.887778°E
- East end: Westerdok
- To: Westerkanaal

The Zoutkeetsgracht (Salt sheds canal) is a canal to the west of the center of Amsterdam.

== Location ==
The canal separates the Westelijke Eilanden (Western Islands) of the Centrum district from the Zeeheldenbuurt in Amsterdam-West. It connects the Westerdok (under Petemayenbrug) with the Westerkanaal (under Zoutkeetsbrug). Smallepadsgracht enters Zoutkeetsgracht from the south just before Zoutkeetsbrug.

== History ==
The canal is named after the salt factories that stood on both sides of the canal in the 17th and 18th centuries. The canal is already shown on the city map of Gerrit de Broen from 1737 as "Soutkeets Graft". These were sheds along the canal where the coarse salt was processed and made suitable for domestic use. The flour and bread factory "Holland" was also there for some time, but after the demolition of the factory new homes were built on the site.

== Trams ==
From 1900 to 1942 tram line 10 had its end point at the end of the Planciusstraat at the Zoutkeetsgracht. In 1907 the circuit was brought into use via Zoutkeetsgracht - Houtmankade - Eerste Breeuwersstraat. Line 19 also had its end point here between 1923 and 1944 Line 10 was moved to Van Hallstraat in 1942. Since 1951, line 3 has its end point here.

In 2000, the municipality decided to name the piece of quay along Zoutkeetsgracht 211 to 221, where the tram has its terminus, as Korte Zoutkeetsgracht. This has cleared up a lot of confusion among postmen, visitors and buyers. [1] As a result, the tram stop is no longer in the street whose name it bears. This is the only tram end point in Amsterdam on a canal.

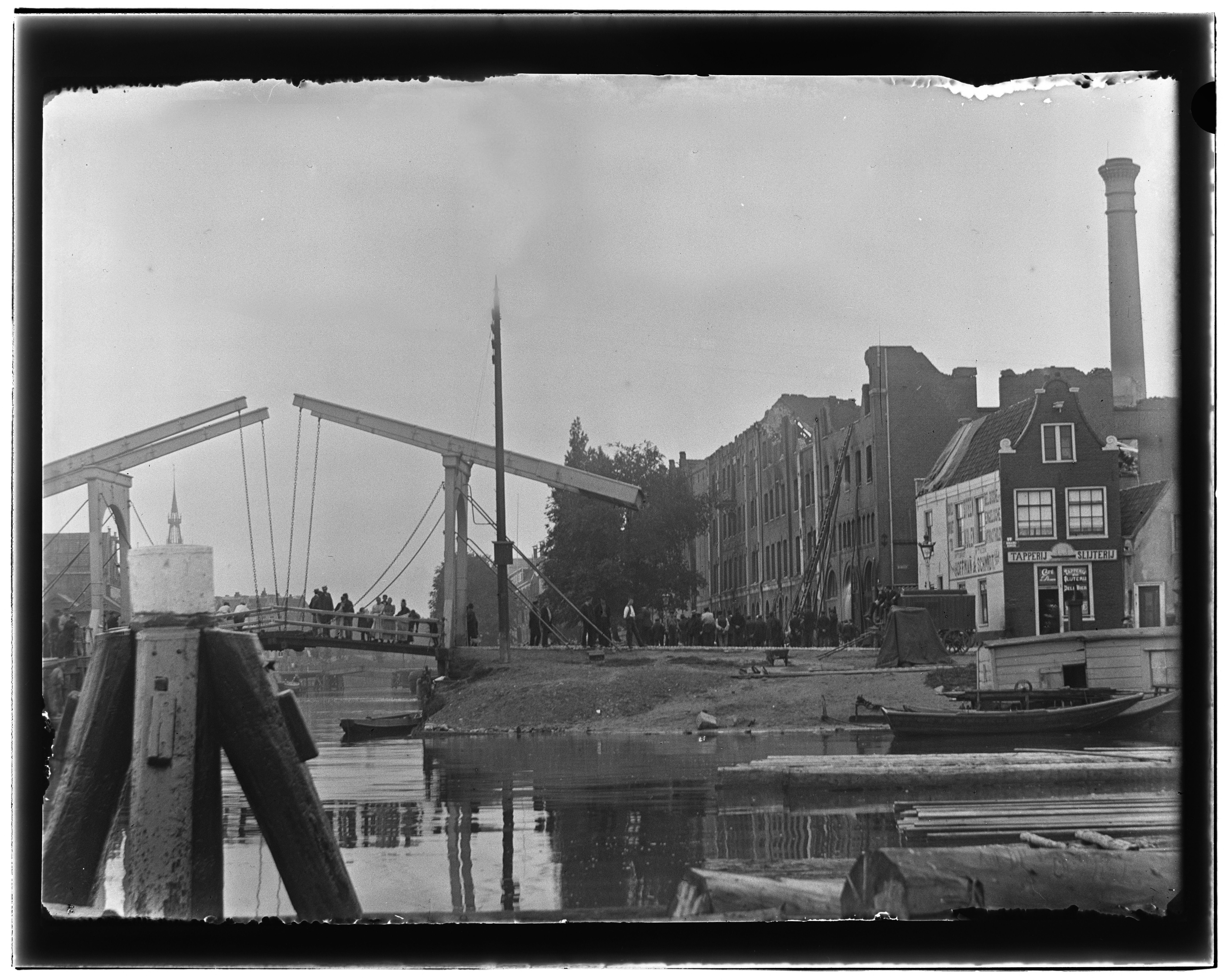
After the fire of the 'Holland' bread factory. In the foreground is bridge no. 317 ('Petemayen bridge') between Zandhoek (left) and Bokkinghang (right). Jacob Olie 1894

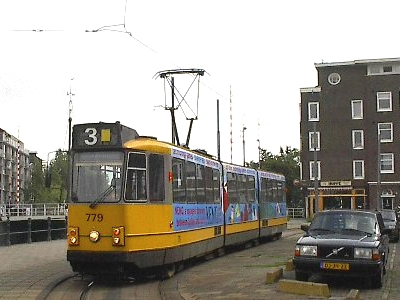
Tram line 3 at the Zoutkeetsgracht terminus, just visible on the left.

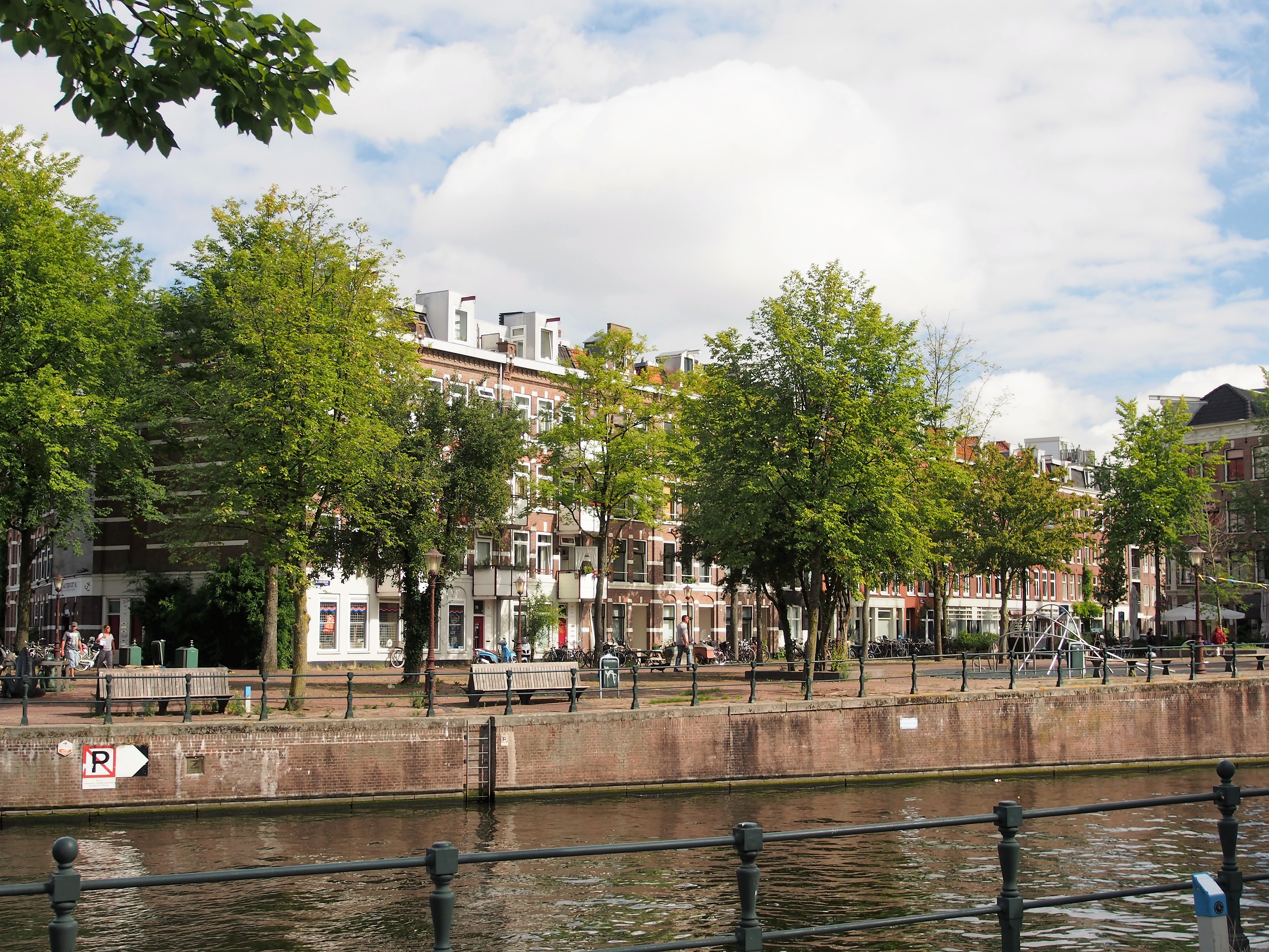
Zoutkeetsgracht and Barenstzstraat

== See also ==
- Canals of Amsterdam
