= Smallepadsgracht =

Canal in Amsterdam

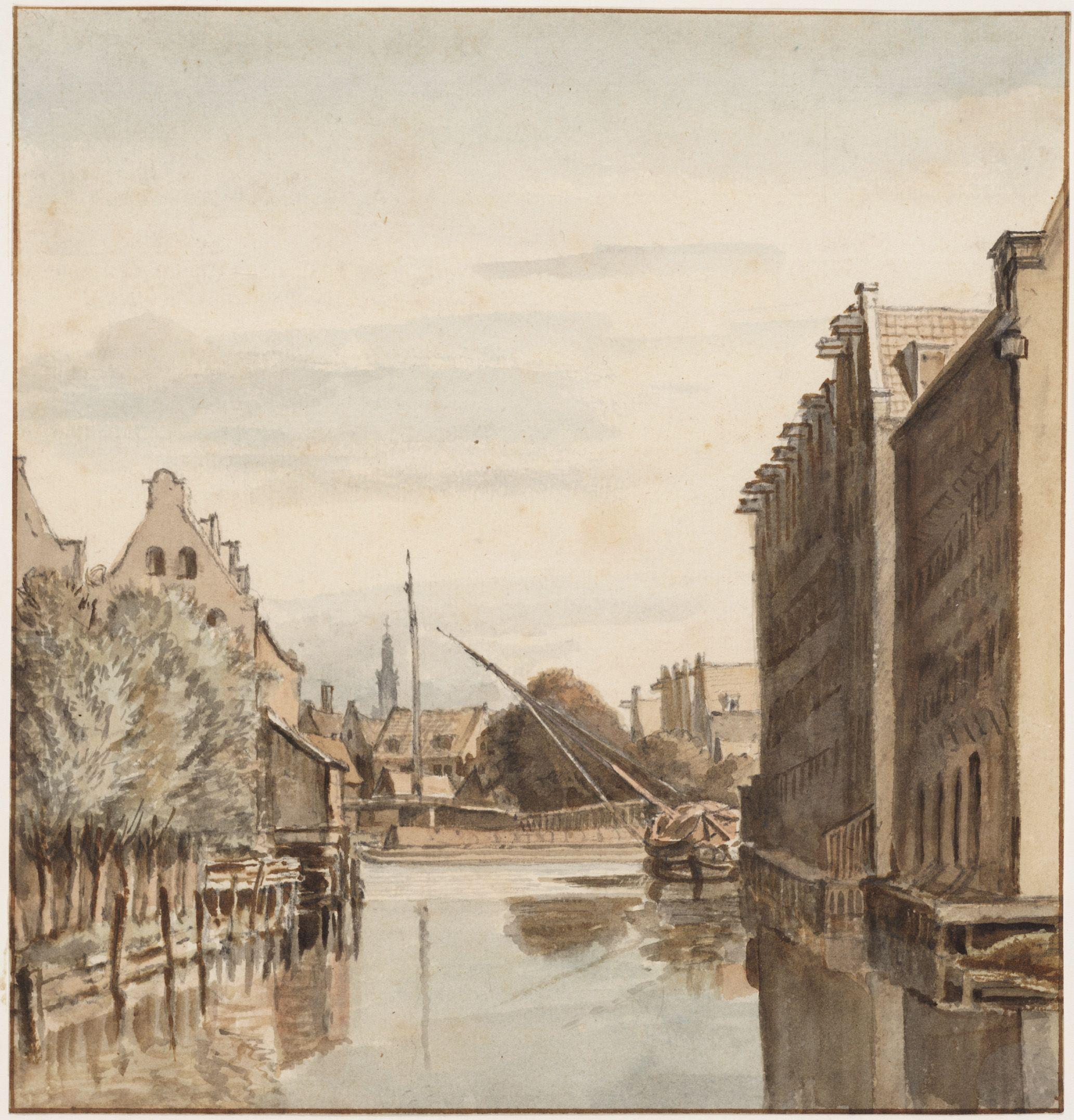
- Smallepadsgracht 1818 by Gerrit Lamberts
- Interactive map of Smallepadsgracht
- Location: Amsterdam
- Postal code: 1016
- Coordinates: 52.387442°N 4.885917°E
- North end: Zoutkeetsgracht
- To: Realengracht / Prinseneilandsgracht

Construction
- Construction start: 17th century

The Smallepadsgracht (Narrow path canal in Dutch) is a short and narrow canal in the Amsterdam-Centrum district of Amsterdam. It is in the Westelijke Eilanden (Western Islands) neighborhood.

== Description ==
The Smallepadsgracht is on the west side of the Realeneiland and connects the Zoutkeetsgracht with the Realengracht and Prinseneilandsgracht. Unusually, there are no bridges over this canal, nor is there a quay that runs along the canal. Vierwindenstraat on Realeneiland terminates on the canal.

Smallepadsgracht originated in the defenses of Amsterdam added outside the Haarlemmerdijk and Hogendijk during the expansion of the city, with the active advice of Maurice, Prince of Orange. A path ran along the strongholds, ramparts and mills, the Smalle Pad (Narrow Path). The counterpart of the Lijnbaansgracht outside the dike was a ditch along that Narrow Path, sometimes called the Smallepadsgracht.

The Brandspuitenboek by Jan van der Heyden has is an etching of the path and canal: "Fire on June 24, 1680 in three ropemakers on the Schans on the Smallepadsgracht". Another engraving, attributed to Laurens Scherm, shows the ruins of the three burnt out lijnbanen. On the Schutterswijkkaart from around 1770 the present Planciusstraat is named "Het Smalle Pad", with the Smalle Pads Graft converging towards the road at its northern end towards the lock on Zoutkeetsgracht.

== Gallery ==
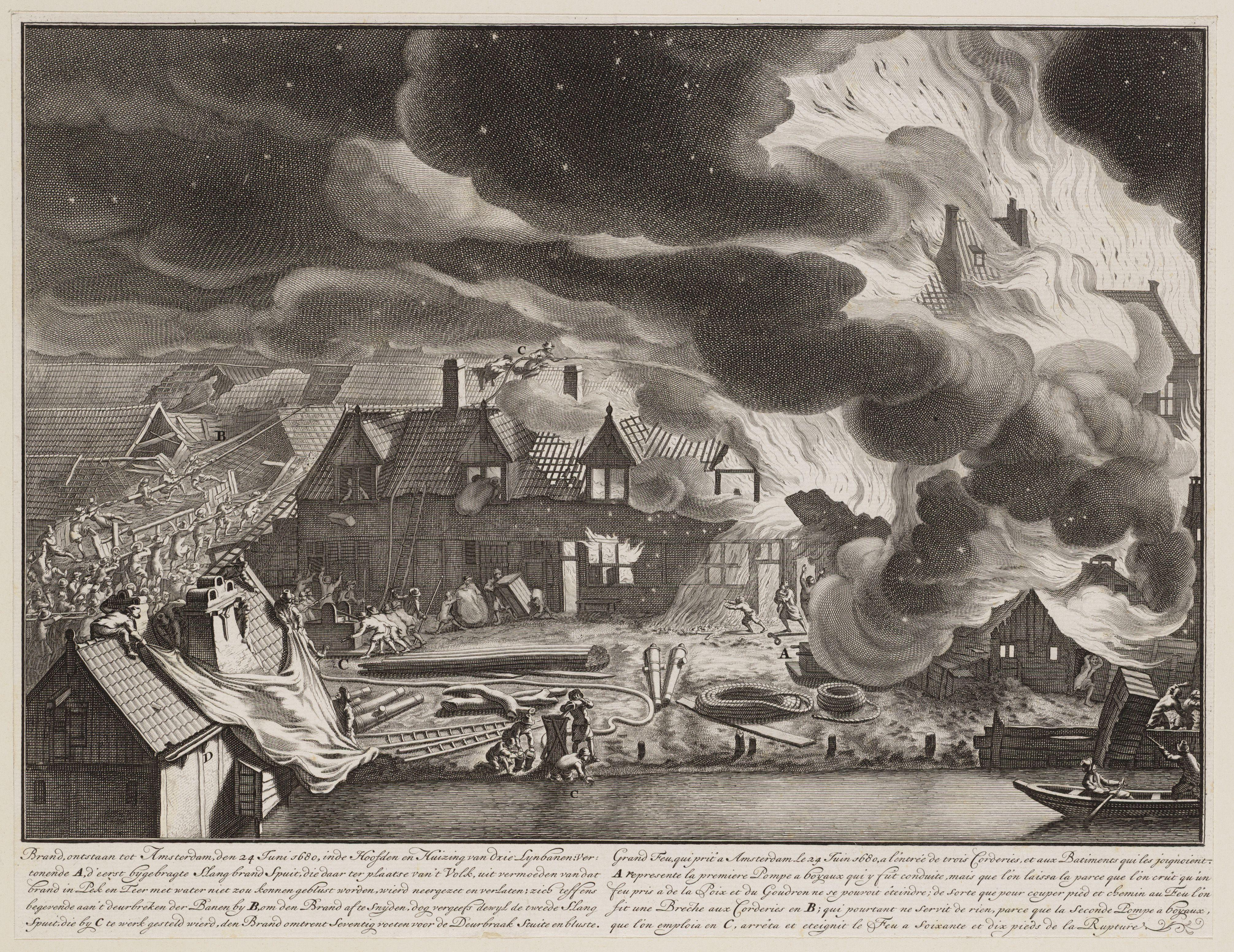
Brand op 24 juni 1680 in drie lijnbanen op de Schans aan de Smallepadsgracht. Jan van der Heyden (1690)

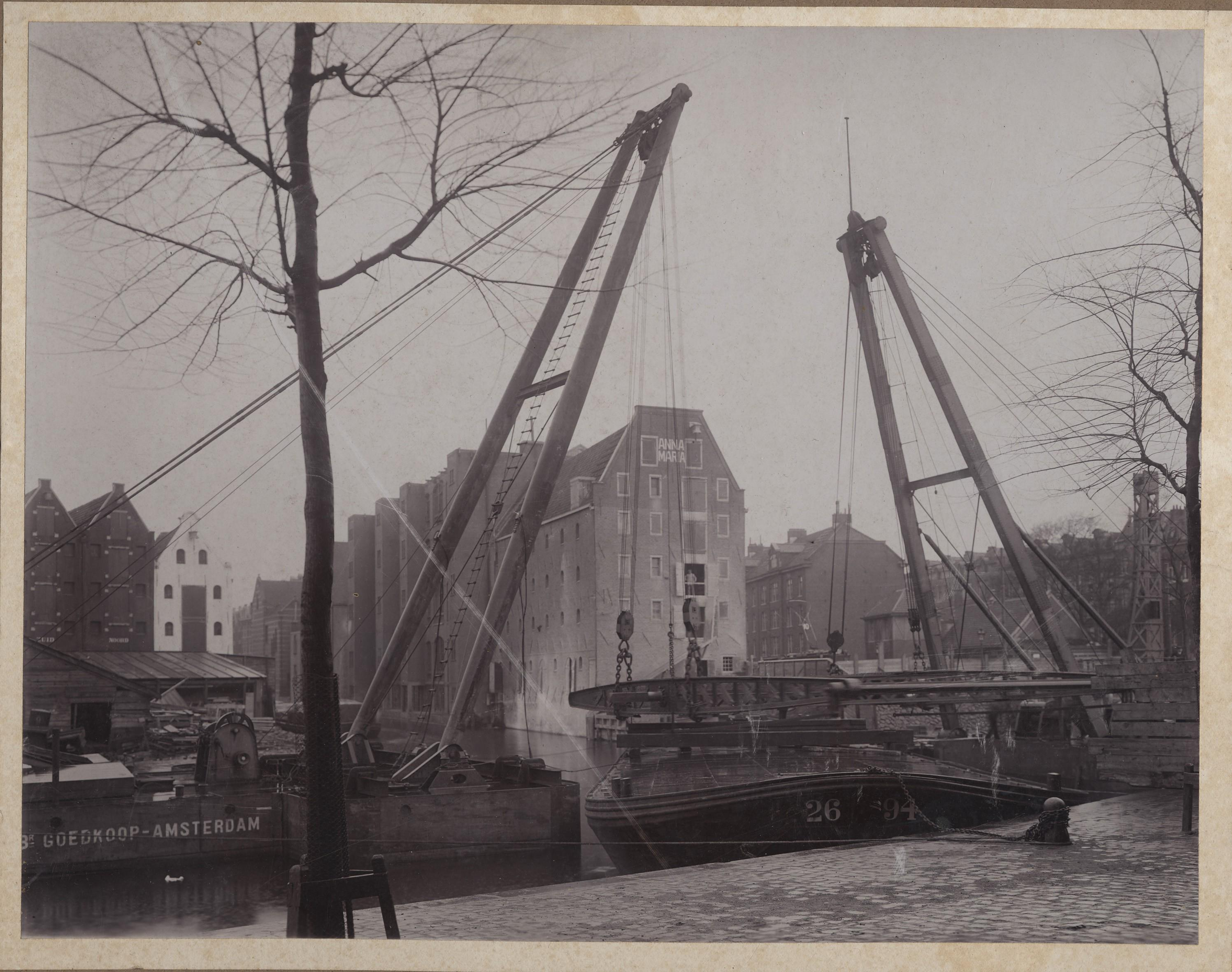
Construction Zoutkeetsbrug (Bridge 318) over the Zoutkeetsgracht. Left: Vierwindenstraat 27-31 warehouses. Center: Smallepadsgracht and rear of Planciusstraat 1-23. Right: rear of houses on Houtmankade.

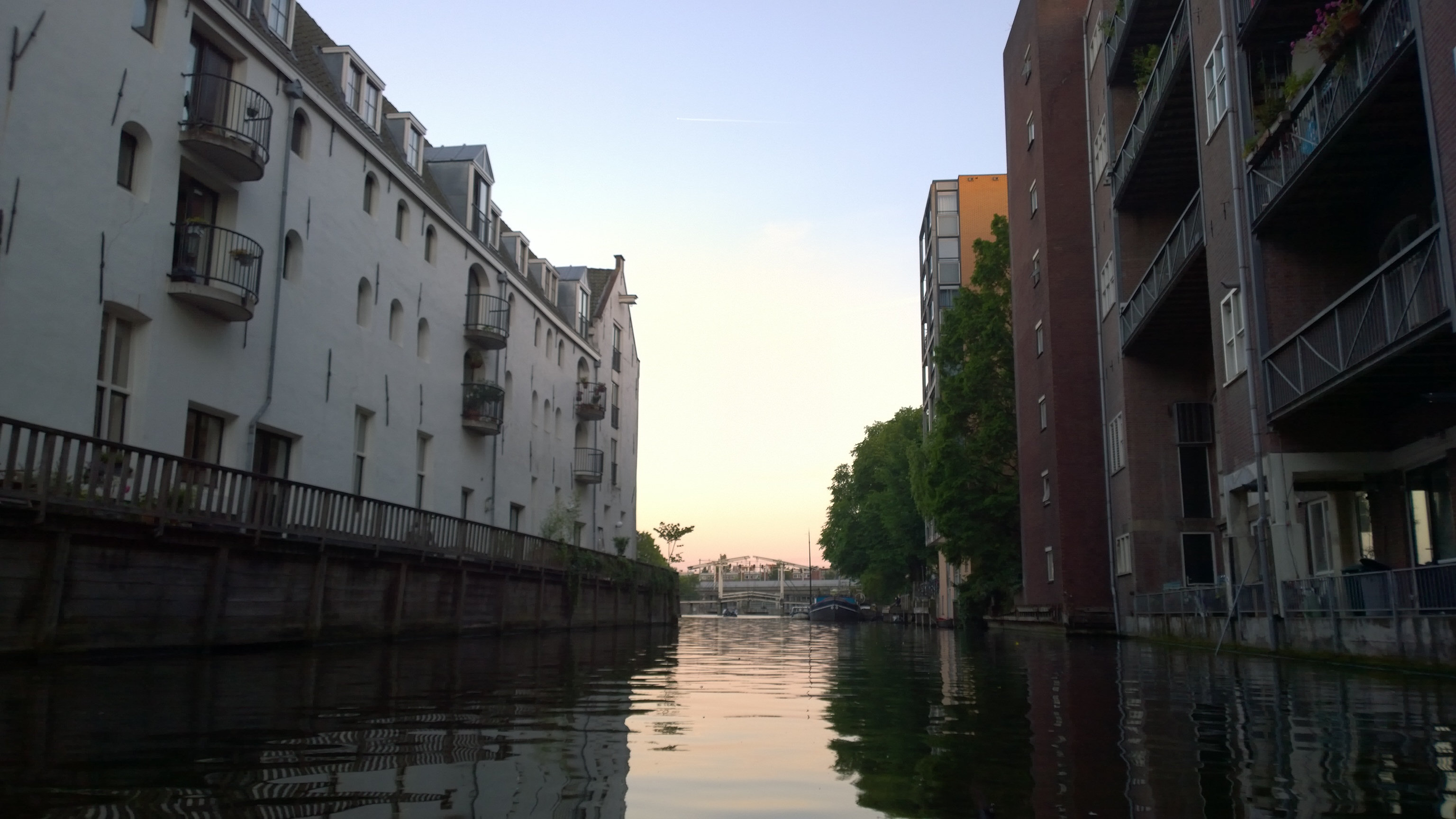
Smallepadsgracht and the Sloterdijkerbrug on Prinseneilandsgracht in the rear (June 2014)

== See also ==
- Canals of Amsterdam

== Sources ==
- Huyser, Bram; Bakker, Theo, "van Smalle Pad tot Planciusstraat" (PDF), Theo Bakker’s Domein
- Ruïnes van de drie uitgebrande lijnbanen op de schans aan de Smallepadsgracht, 1680, Laurens Scherm (toegeschreven aan), naar Jan van der Heyden, 1690 - 1735 (in Dutch), rijksmuseum
