= Realengracht =

Canal in Amsterdam

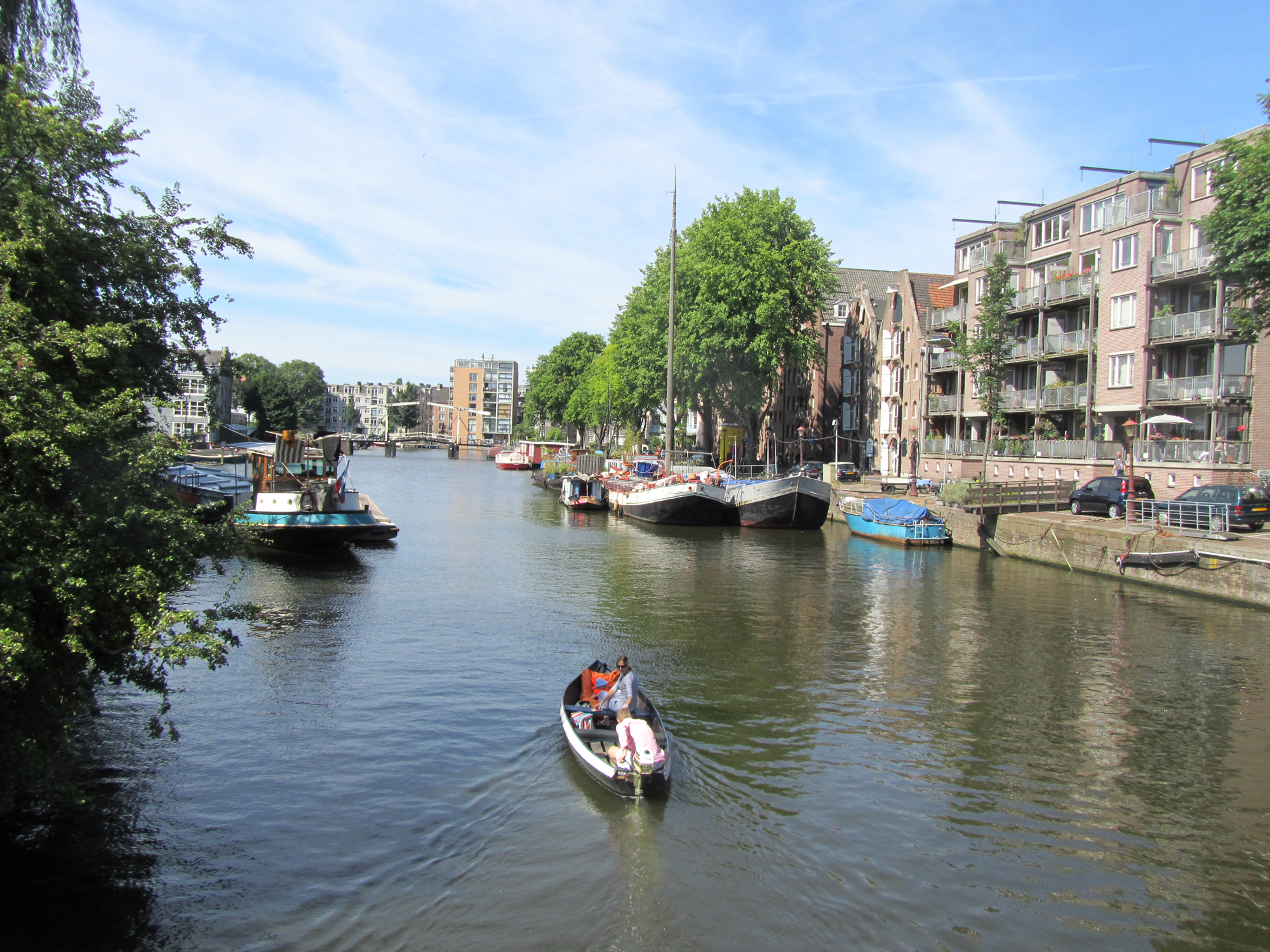
- Realengracht

- Location within Amsterdam
- Location: Amsterdam
- Postal code: 1013
- Coordinates: 52.386943°N 4.887629°E
- West end: Smallepadsgracht / Prinseneilandsgracht
- To: Westerdok

The Realengracht is a canal in Amsterdam, in the Centrum district.

== Location ==
The canal is on the south side of the Realeneiland and connects the junction of the Smallepadsgracht and the Prinseneilandsgracht with the Westerdok near the Zandhoek. Prinseneiland and Bickerseiland are to the south of the canal. Bickersgracht enters the center of the canal from the south. The Realengracht is the only canal in Amsterdam that has two wooden drawbridges, bridges nos. 316 and 320.

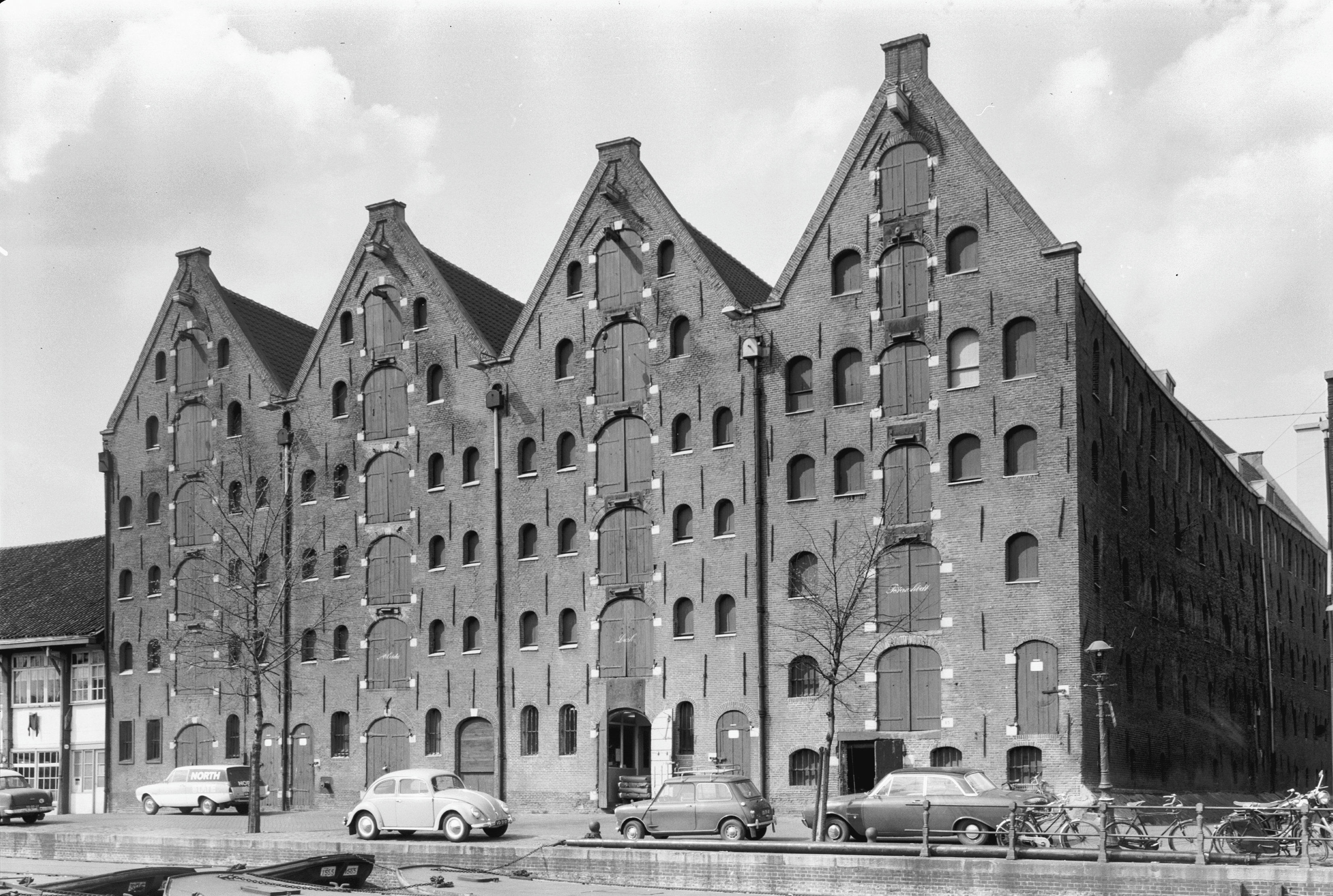
Warehouses on the Realengracht, 1964

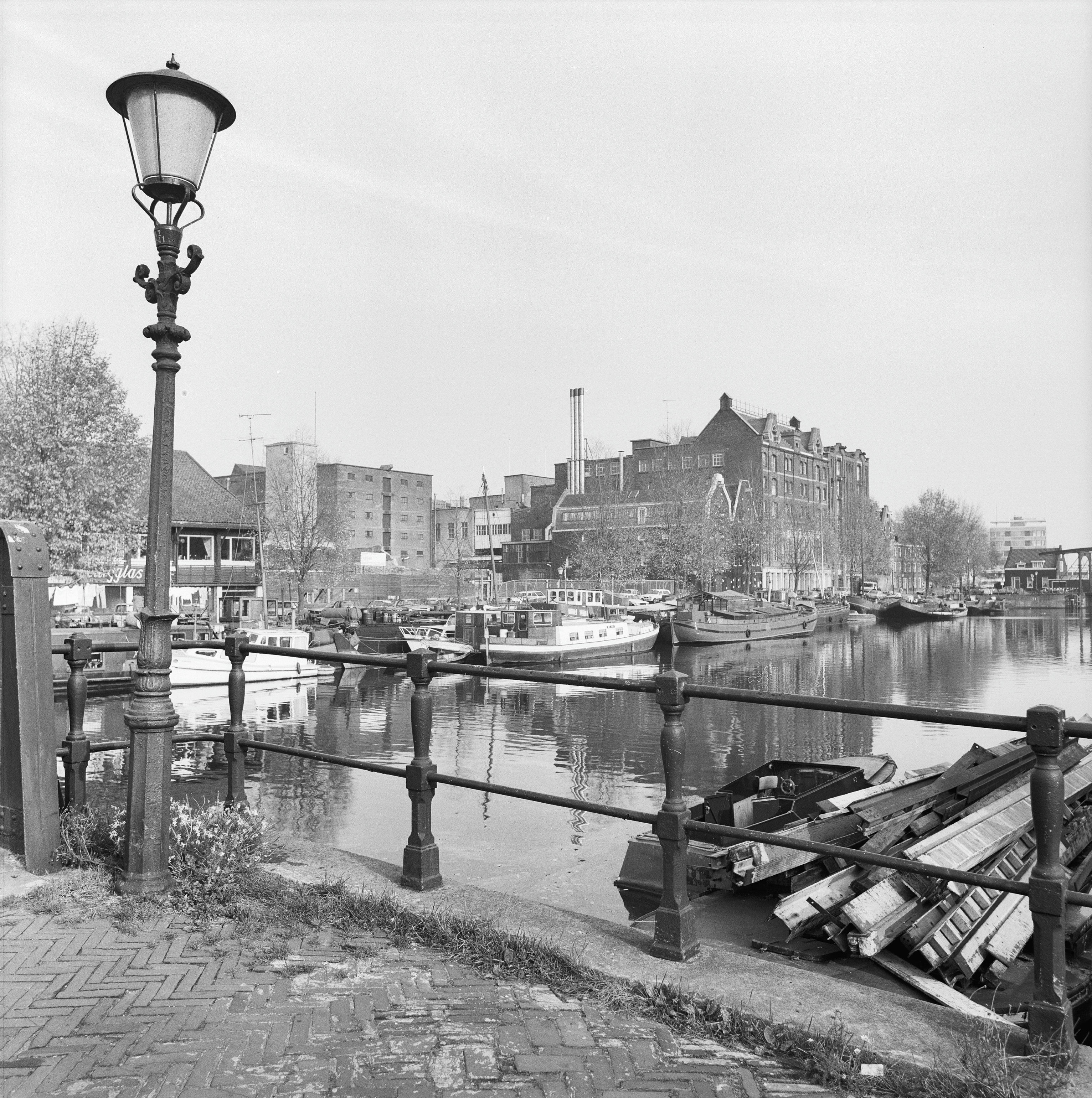
Overview of the Realengracht, 1978.

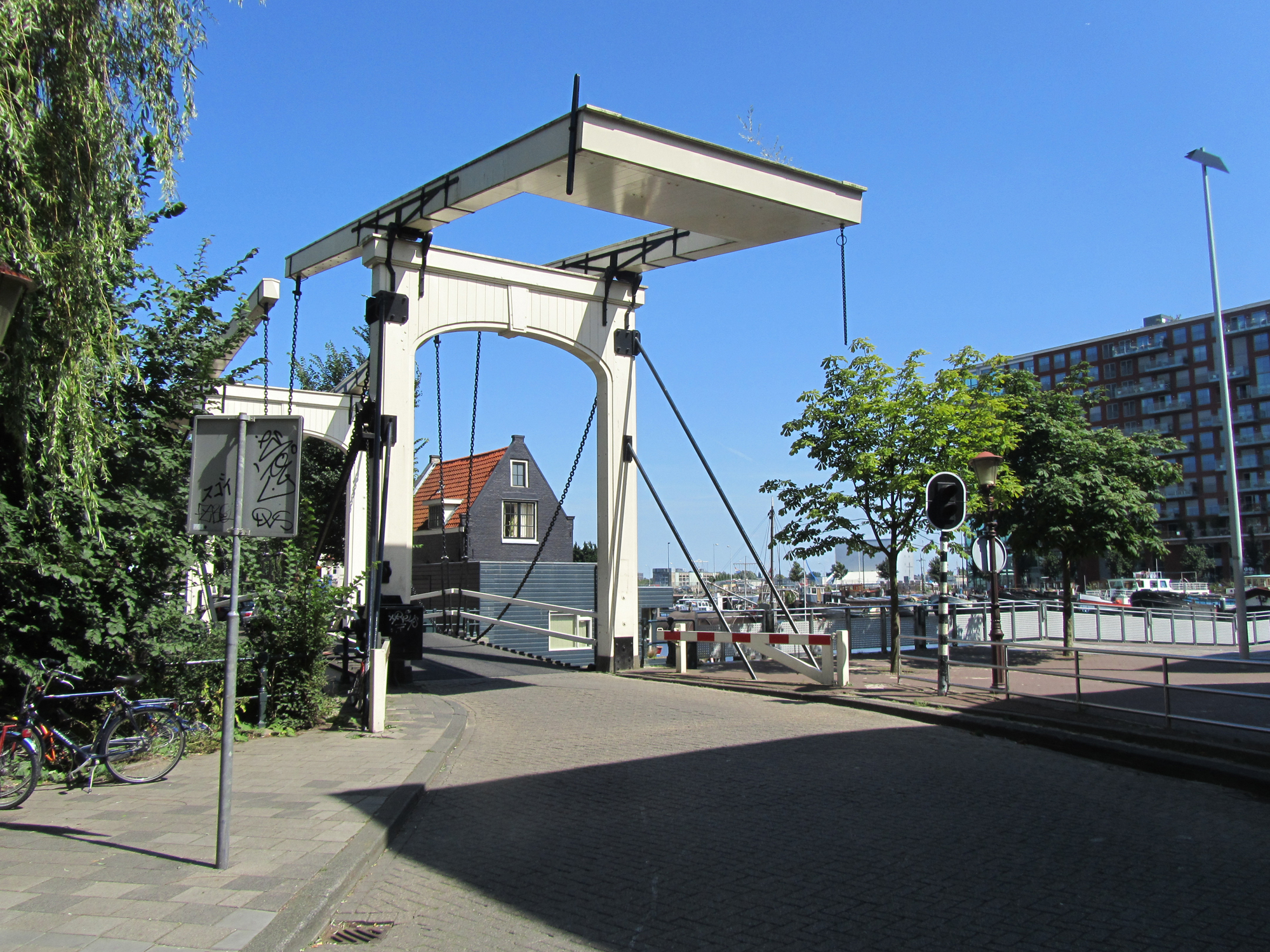
Bridge No. 316 (Zandhoek Bridge), corner Realengracht / Westerdok

== See also ==
- Canals of Amsterdam
