= Gerrit Lamberts =

Dutch painter and curator

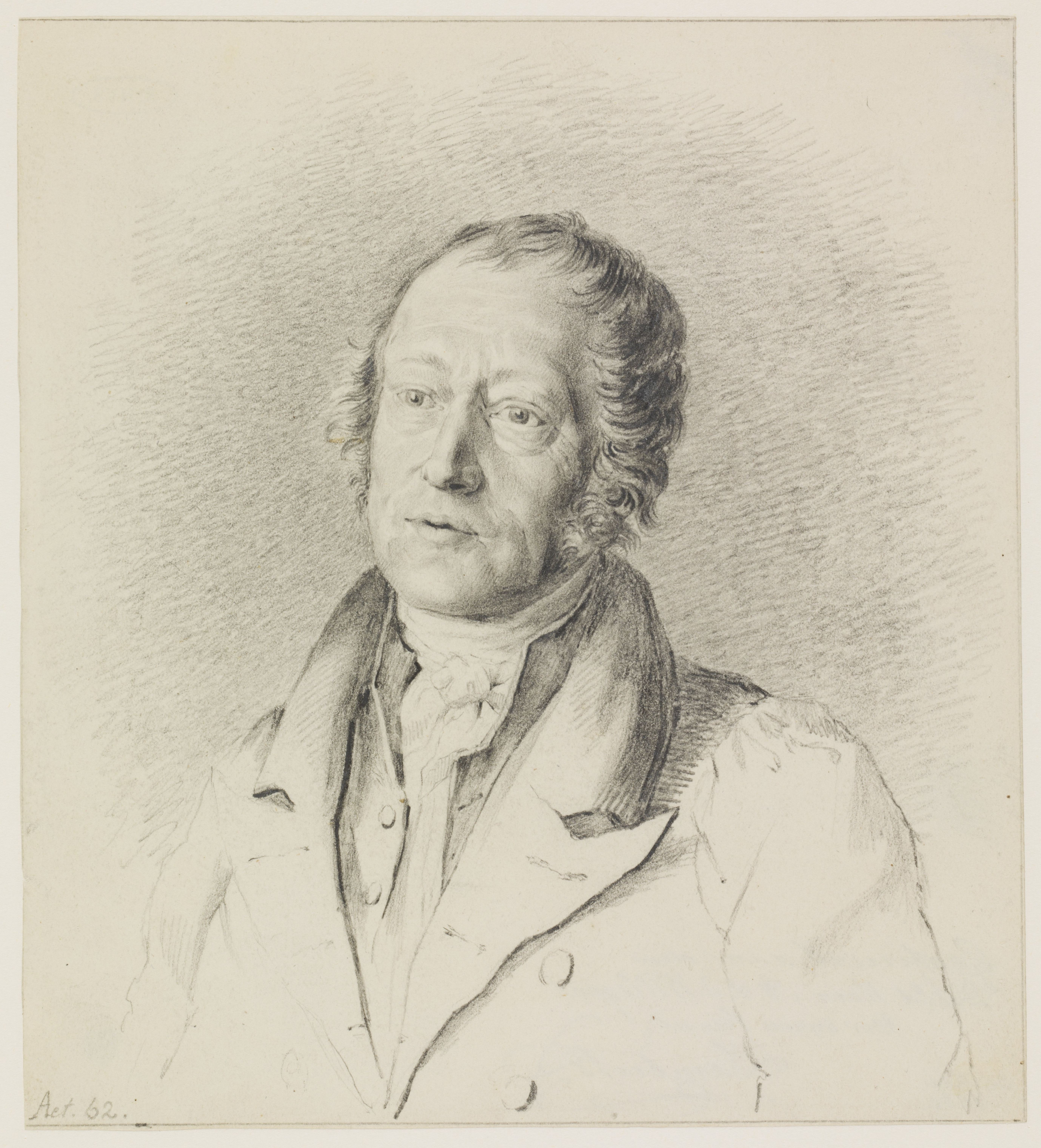
- Self portrait (1840)
- Born: 19 October 1776; Amsterdam, Dutch Republic
- Died: 16 April 1850 (aged 73); Amsterdam, Netherlands
- Known for: Topographic drawings of Amsterdam

Gerrit Lamberts (1776–1850) was a Dutch painter and curator of the Rijksmuseum when it was located in the Trippenhuis.

Lamberts was born in Amsterdam. He started out as a merchant selling paper and later became a watercolorist, draughtsman and engraver. He is known for topographic drawings of cityscapes, architectural views of buildings and his watercolors of art galleries. He was also a bookseller and became the curator of the museum in Amsterdam in 1825. He was a member of the Amsterdam academy which was housed in the same building.

== Images ==
Two of the main display rooms of the Trippenhuis-Museum

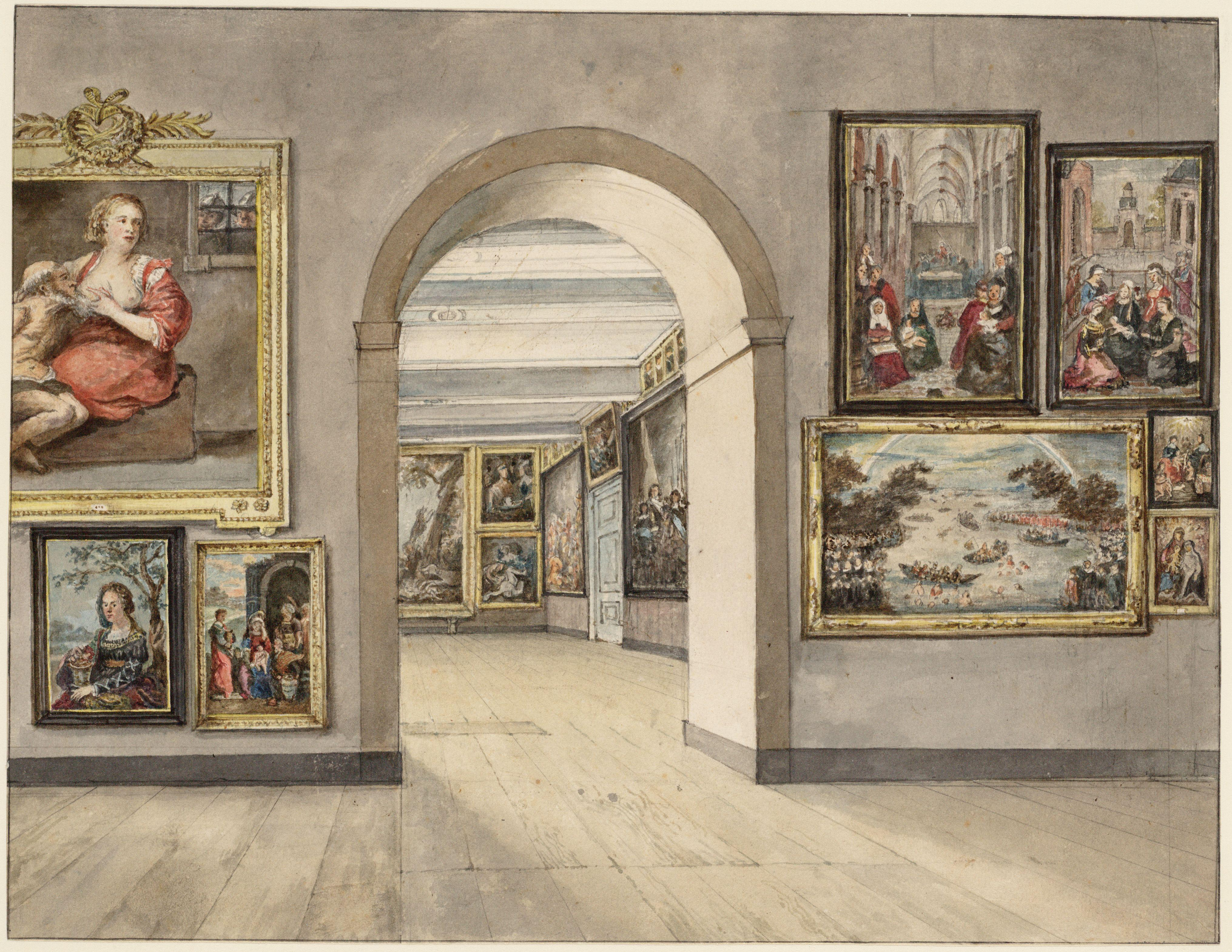
The Trippenhuis in the 1830s

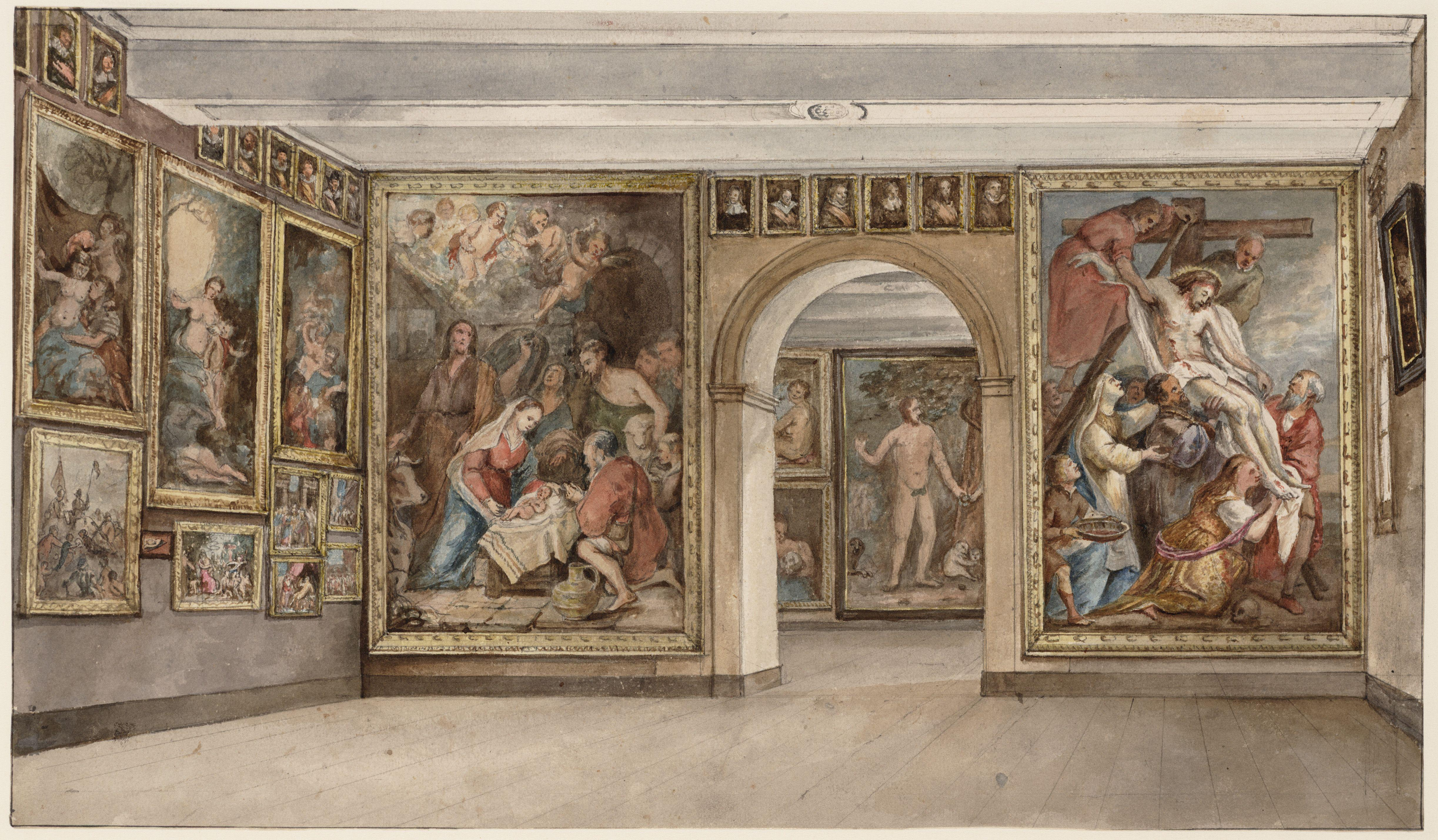

Two views of the print room of the Trippenhuis-Museum

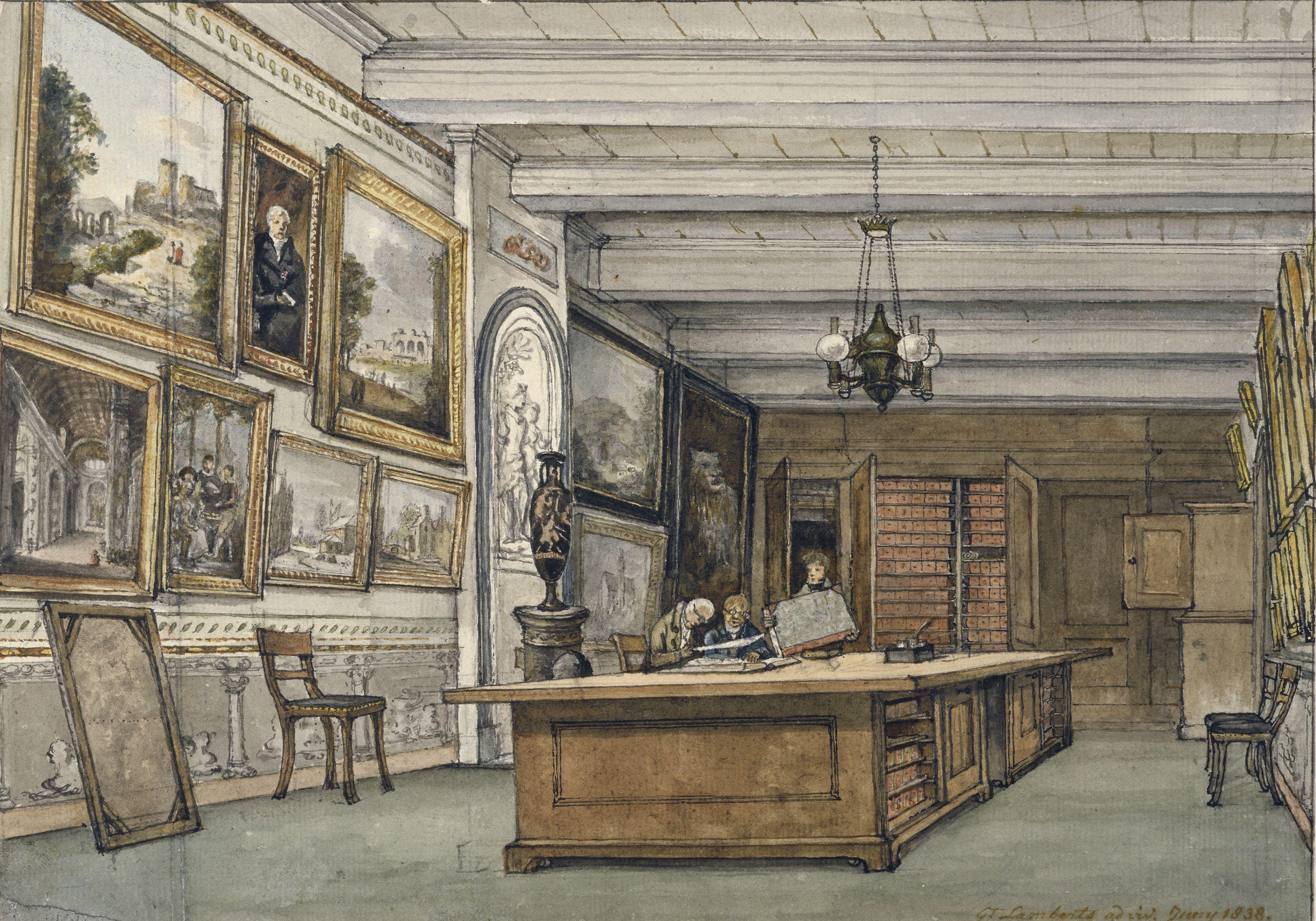

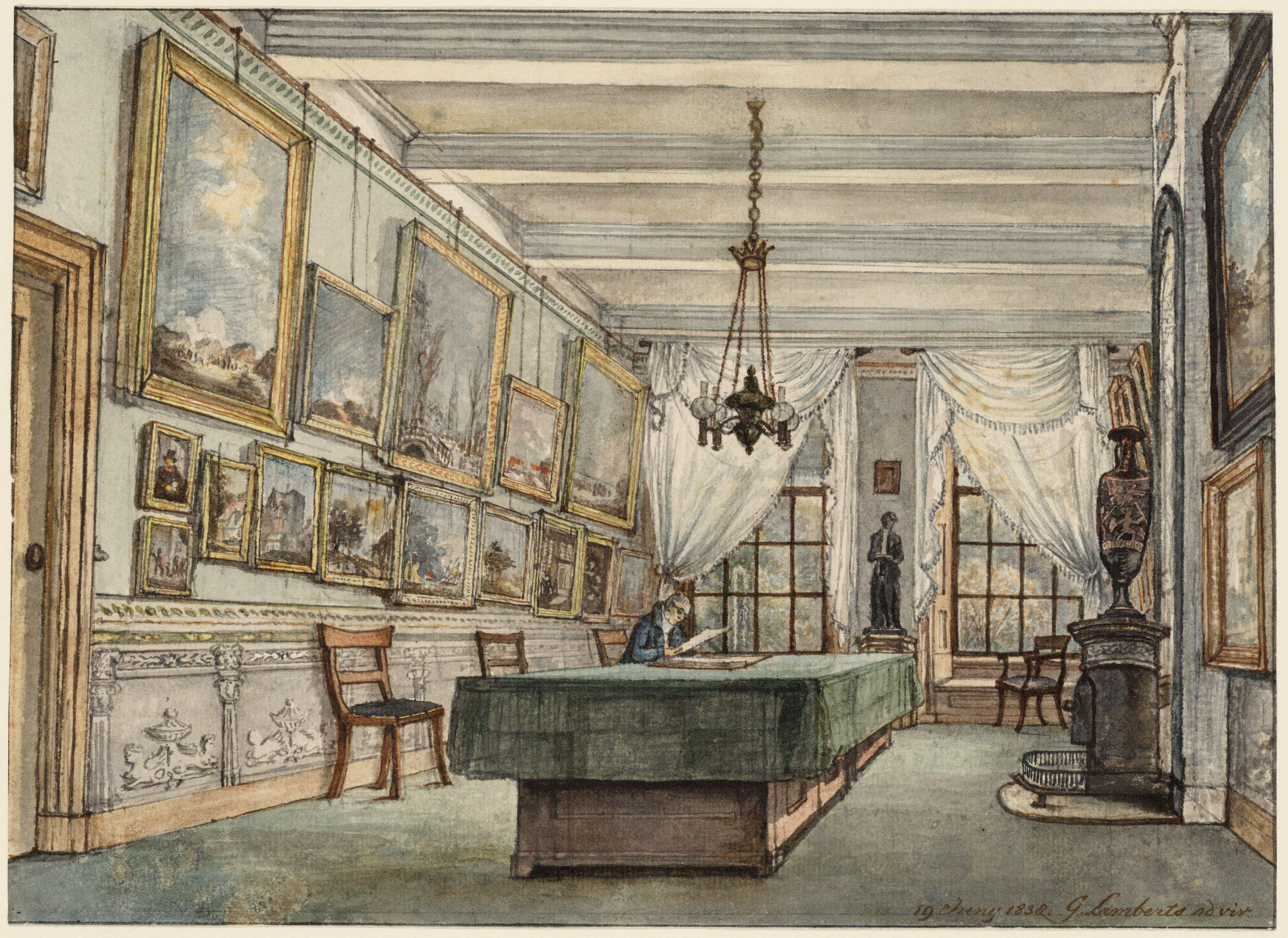

His views of the print room include a self-portrait, and the paintings hanging on the walls were modern works that later were moved to the Paviljoen Welgelegen in Haarlem, which became the national museum of "living masters", or modern art. He wrote a catalog of the book collection of Jacobus Koning (1770-1832) in 1833. Lamberts died in Amsterdam.
