= Jacob Olie =

Dutch photographer

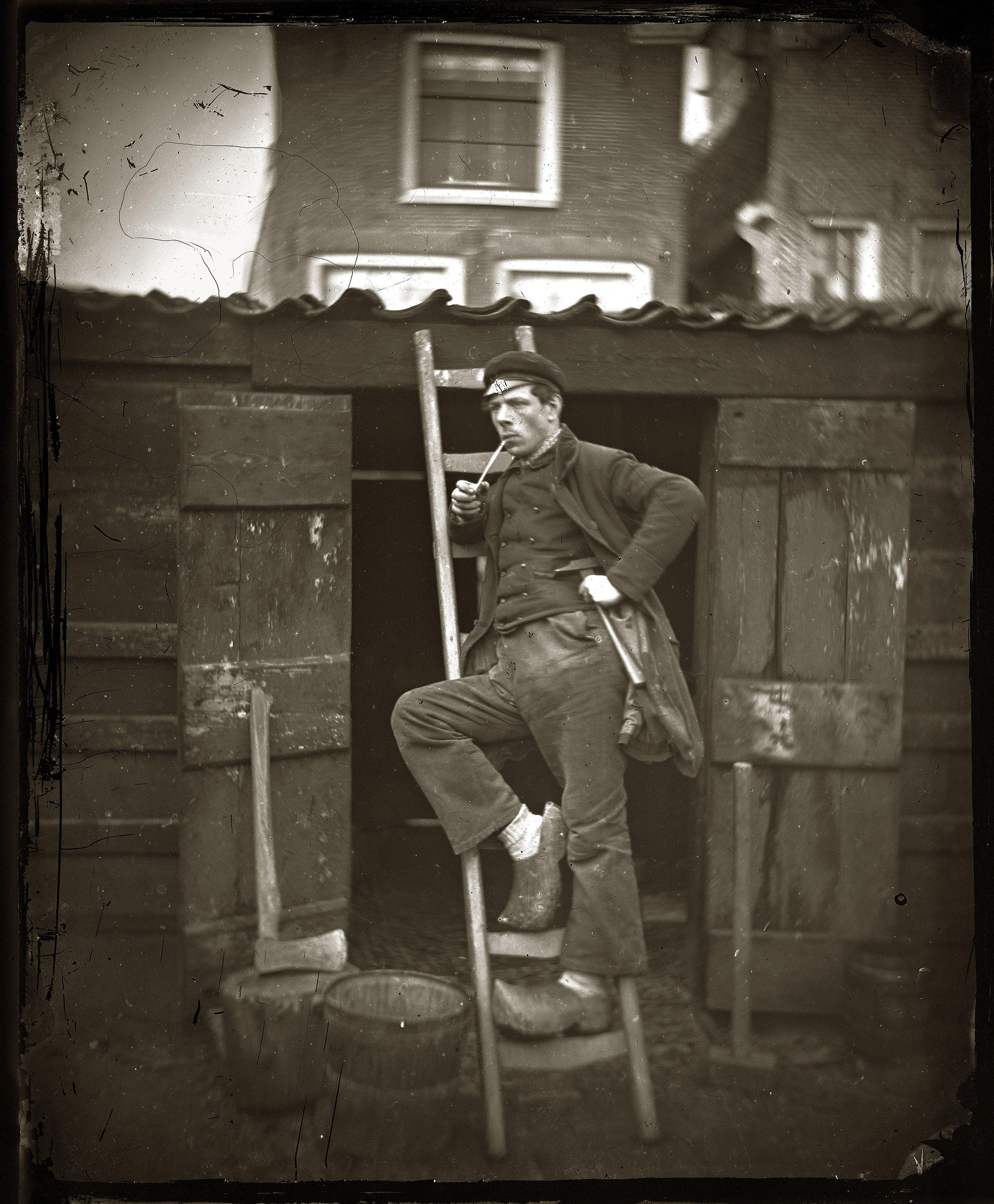
- Born: 19 October 1834
- Died: 23 April 1905 (aged 70)
- Occupation: Photographer (1861–1905), drawing teacher, architect

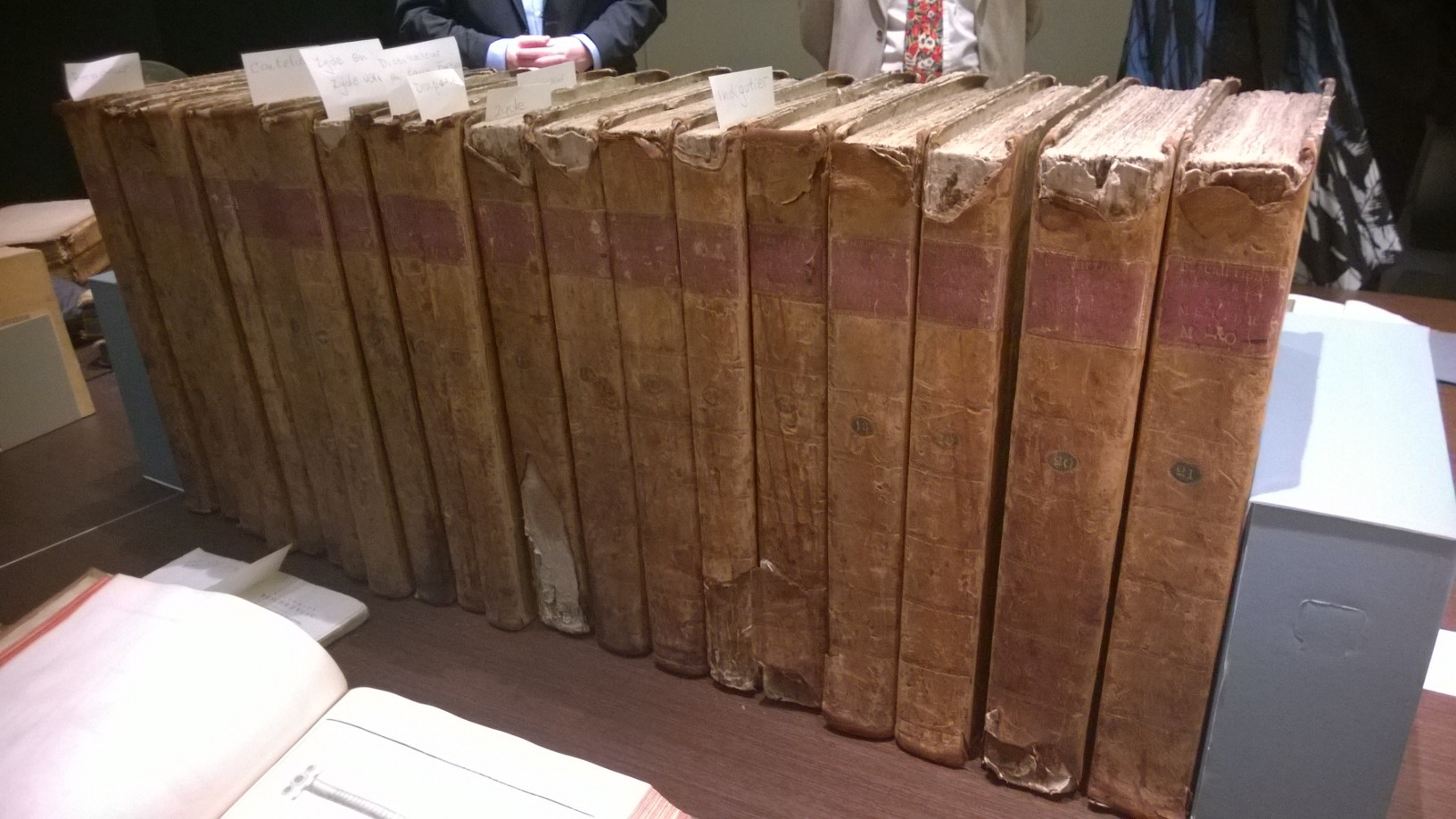
Jacob Olie's well-thumbed copy of the French encyclopedia called Descriptions des Arts et Métiers, given to the special collections department of the University of Amsterdam by Olie's great-grandson

Jacob Olie (1834 – 1905) was a photographer from Amsterdam known for his scenes of everyday life there.

Olie was born in Amsterdam and was trained as a carpenter and draughtsman. He became a teacher at the local school for craftsmen known as the Ambachtsschool, converting it to be the first ever vocational school of the Netherlands for boys. He took up photography as a hobby. Today he is known for his unusually sharp depictions of various parts of Amsterdam that no longer exist. His son by the same name also became a photographer.

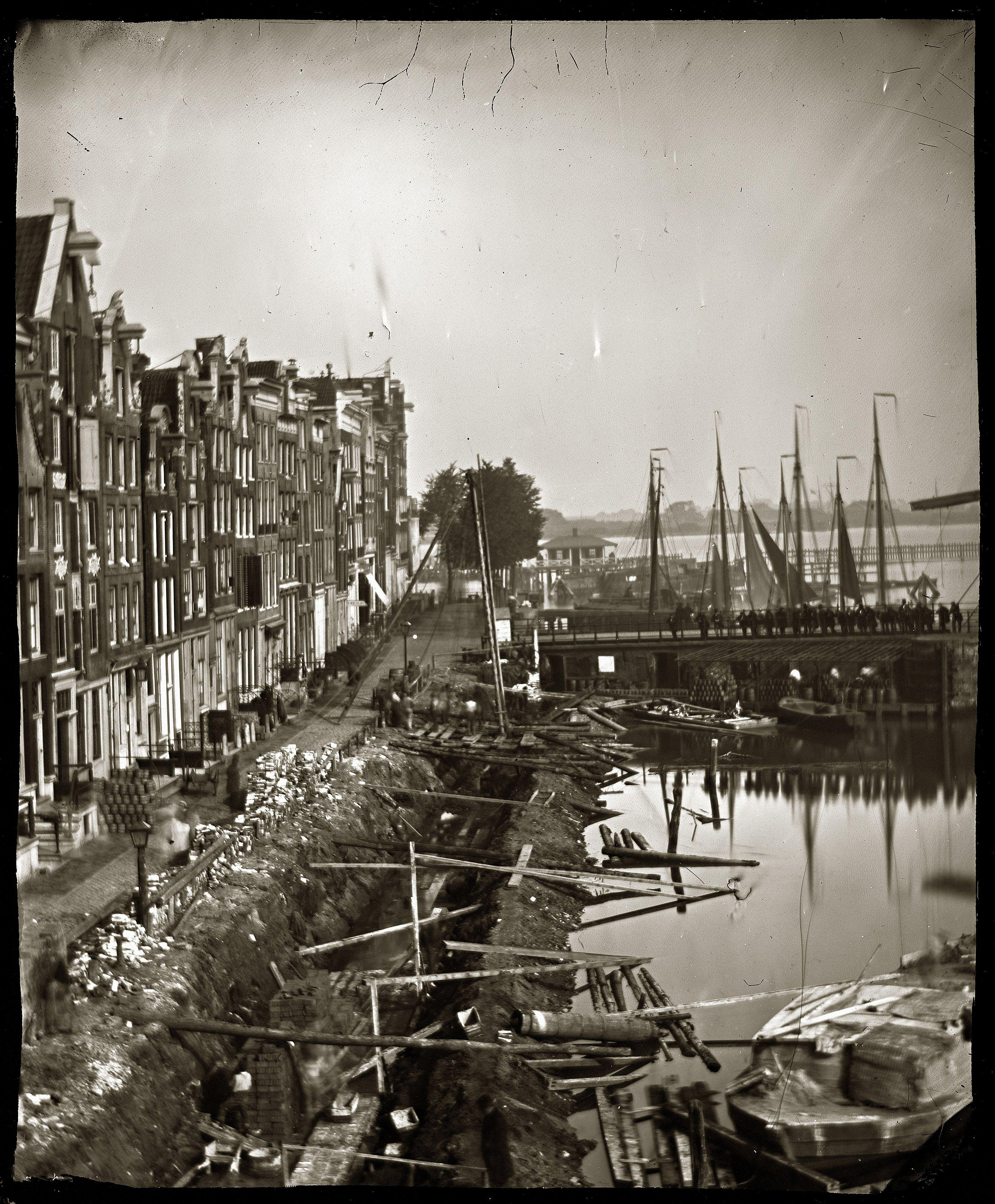
Amsterdam 1863

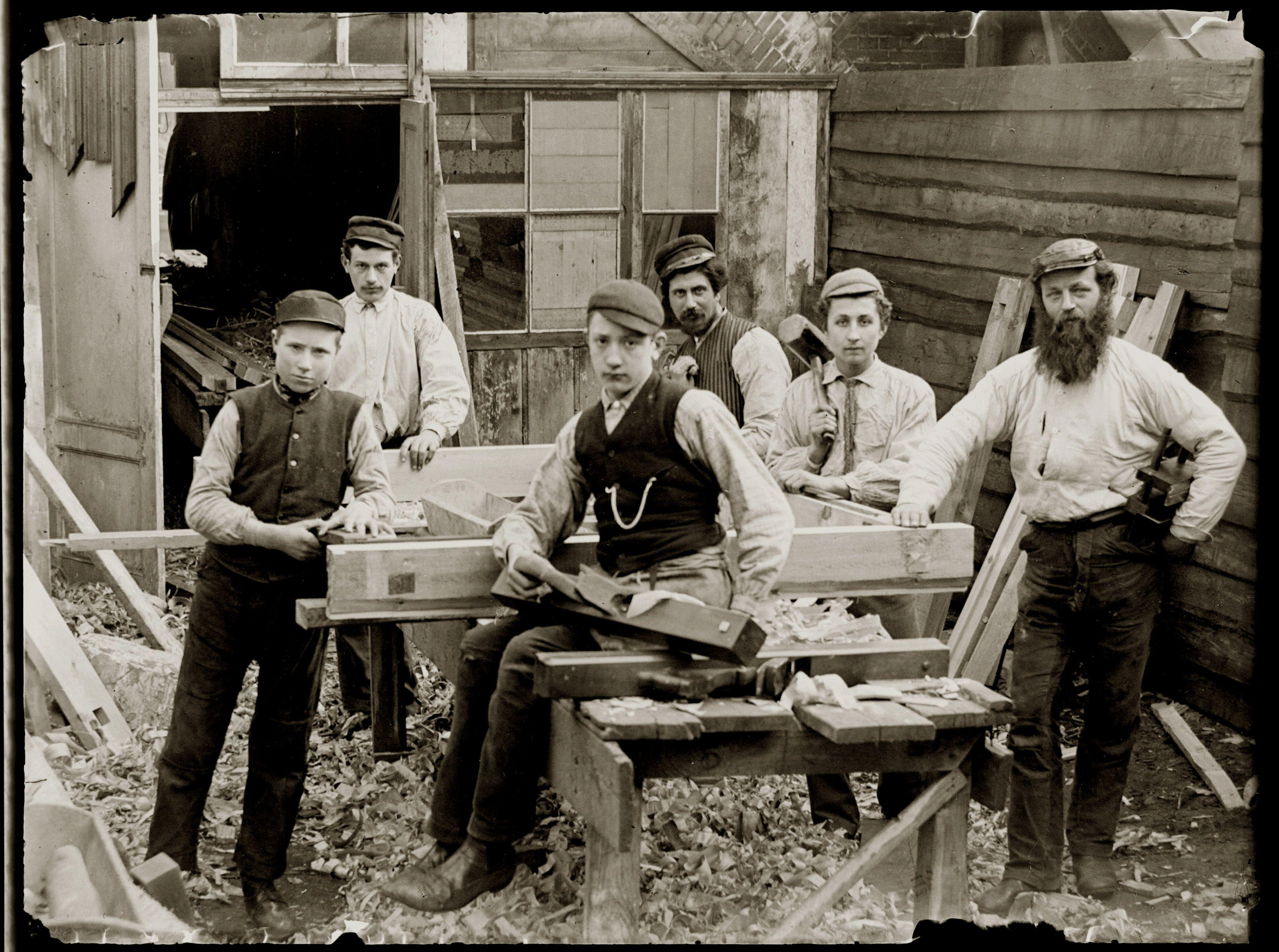
Amsterdam 1890

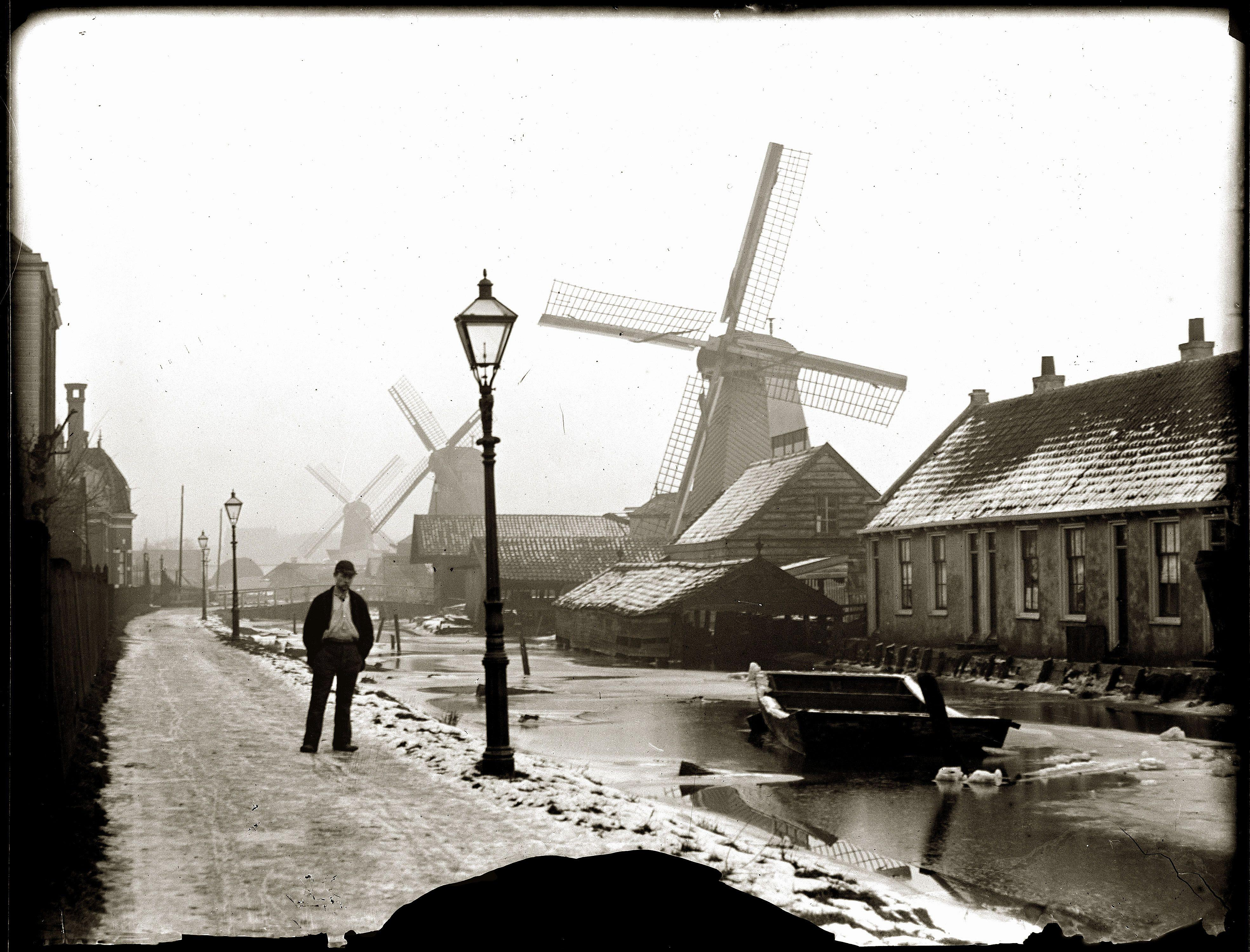
Amsterdam, ca. 1895

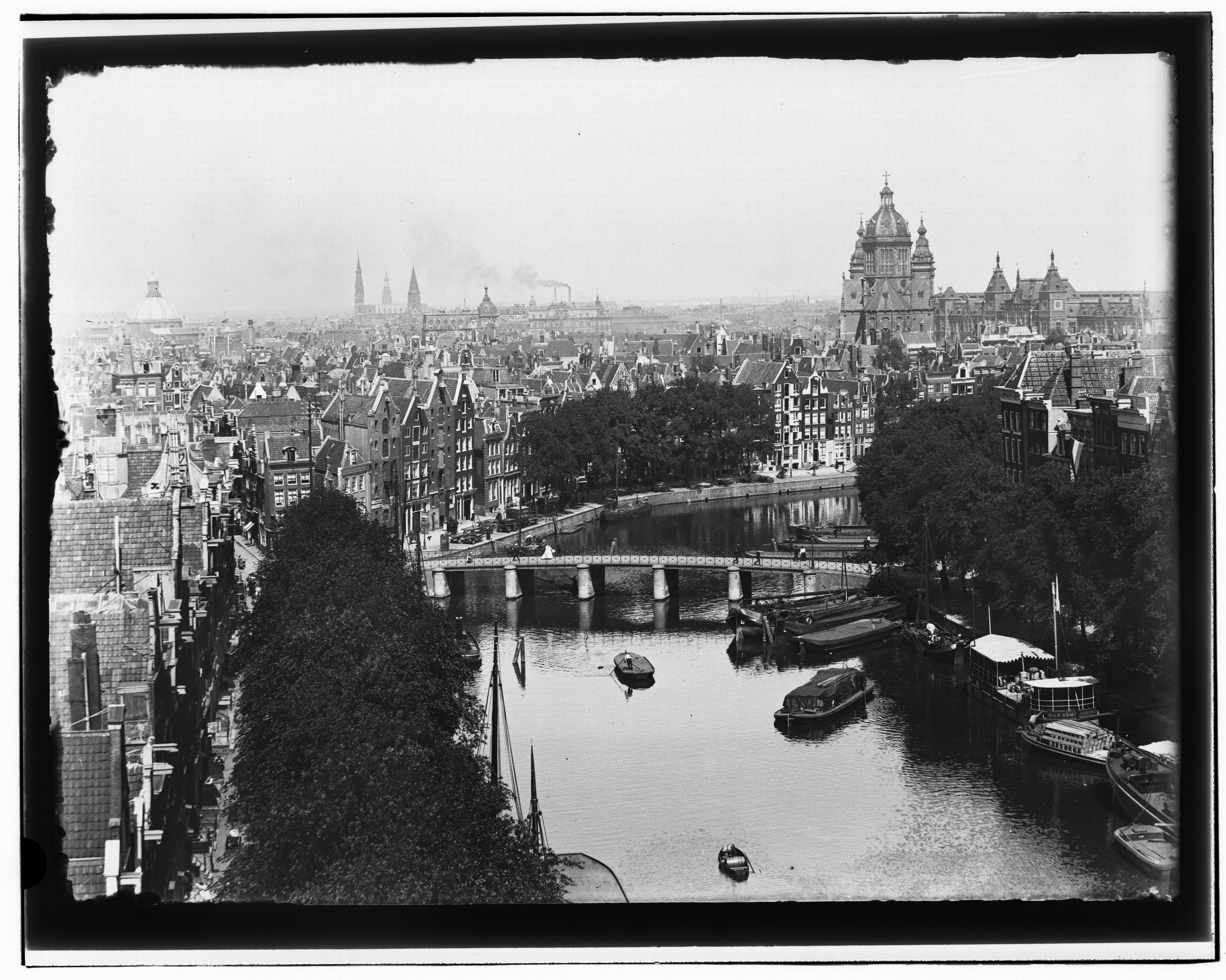
Amsterdam 1896

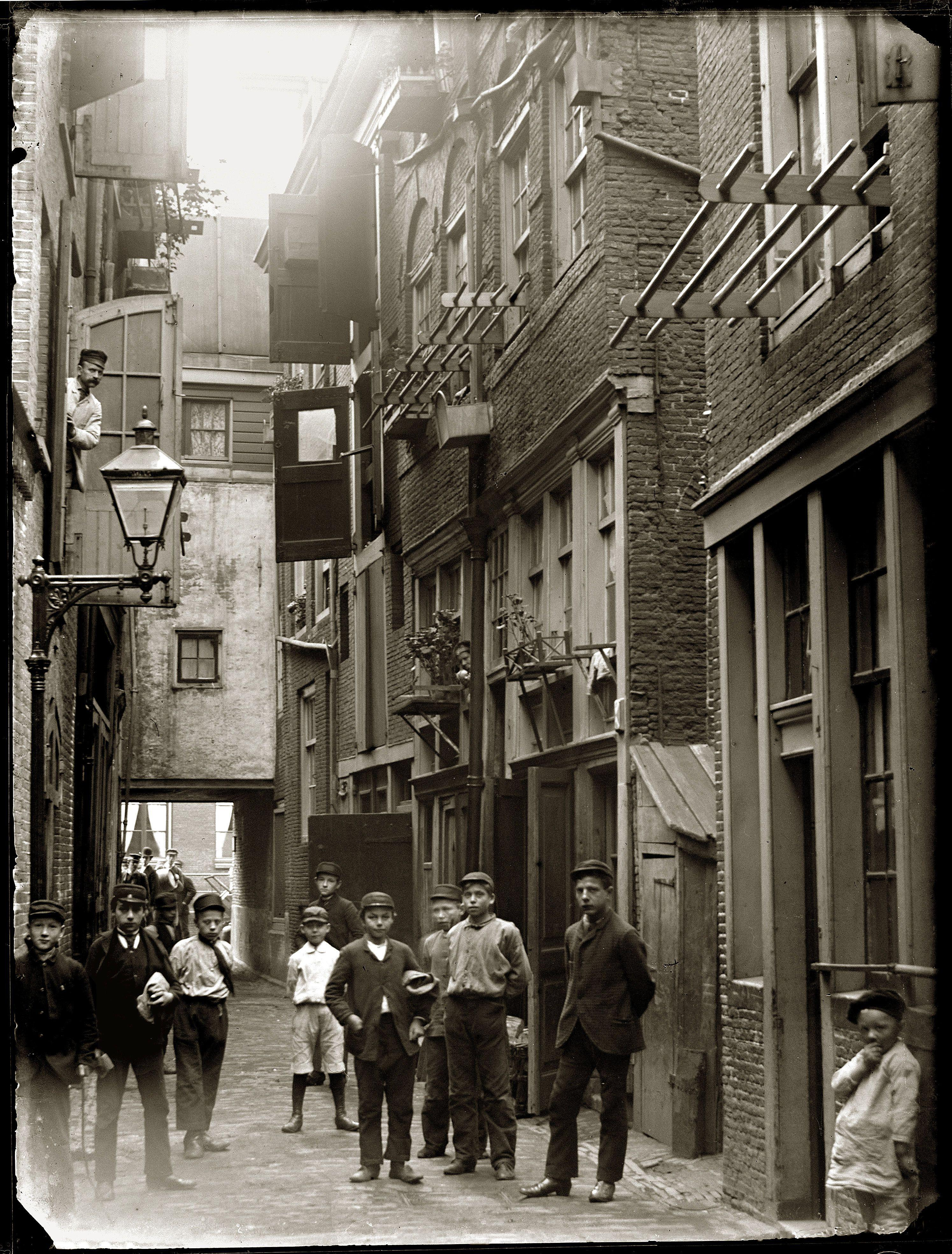
Amsterdam 1892
