= Battle of Jasmund =

Battle of Jasmund may refer to:

- Battle of Jasmund (1676)
- da:Søslaget ved Jasmund (1715) is the Danish name for Battle of Rügen (1715)
- Battle of Jasmund (1864)
