= Battle of Öland =

1676 naval battle of the Scanian War

- Part of the Scanian War
Date	1 June 1676
Location	East coast of Öland, western Baltic Sea 56°26′58″N 16°40′20″E
Result	Dano-Dutch victory

Belligerents
Denmark–Norway; Dutch Republic	(yes) Swedish Empire

Commanders and leaders
(Denmark–Norway) Cornelis Tromp (Denmark–Norway) Niels Juel (Dutch Republic) Philips van Almonde	(Swedish Empire) Lorentz Creutz † (Swedish Empire) Claes Uggla † (Swedish Empire) Johan Bär

Strength
42 warships, including 25 ships of the line	57 warships, including 27 ships of the line c. 12,000 men

Casualties and losses
1 fireship At least 100 dead	5 ships sunk 6 ships captured At least 1,400 dead

The Battle of Öland was a naval battle between an allied Danish and Dutch fleet and the Swedish navy in the Baltic Sea, off the east coast of Öland on 1 June 1676. The battle was a part of the Scanian War (1675–1679) fought for supremacy over the southern Baltic. Sweden was in urgent need of reinforcements for its north German possessions; Denmark sought to ferry an army to Scania in southern Sweden to open a front on Swedish soil.

Just as the battle began, the Swedish flagship Kronan sank, taking with it almost the entire crew, including the Admiral of the Realm and commander of the Swedish navy, Lorentz Creutz. The allied force under the leadership of the Dutch admiral Cornelis Tromp took full advantage of the ensuing disorder on the Swedish side. The acting commander after Creutz's sudden demise, Admiral Claes Uggla, was surrounded and his flagship Svärdet battered in a drawn-out artillery duel, then set ablaze by a fire ship. Uggla drowned while escaping the burning ship, and with the loss of a second supreme commander, the rest of the Swedish fleet fled in disorder.

The battle resulted in Danish naval supremacy, which was maintained throughout the rest of the war. The Danish King Christian V was able to ship troops over to the Swedish side of the Sound, and on 29 June a force of 14,500 men landed at Råå, just south of Helsingborg in southernmost Sweden. Scania became the main battleground of the war, culminating with the bloody battles of Lund, Halmstad and Landskrona. Danish and Dutch naval forces were left free to raze Öland and the Swedish east coast all the way up to the Stockholm Archipelago. The Swedish failure at Öland also prompted King Charles XI to order a commission to investigate the fiasco, but in the end no one was found responsible.

== Background ==
A map of Sweden's territorial gains and losses 1560–1815. After 1660, Sweden was at its peak as a Baltic Sea power, holding the coast along the entire northern Baltic and strategic possessions in the southwest.

In the 1660s, Sweden reached its height as a European great power. It had recently defeated Denmark, one of its main competitors for hegemony in the Baltic, in the Torstenson War (1643–1645) and the Dano-Swedish War (1657–1658). At the Treaties of Brömsebro (1645) and Roskilde (1658), Denmark was forced to cede the islands of Gotland and Ösel, all of its eastern territories on the Scandinavian Peninsula, and parts of Norway. In a third war, from 1658 to 1660, King Charles X of Sweden attempted to finish off Denmark for good. The move was in part due to bold royal ambition, but also a result of Sweden's being a highly militarized society geared for almost constant warfare, a fiscal-military state. Disbanding the Swedish forces meant settling outstanding pay, so there was an underlying incentive to keep hostilities alive and let soldiers live off enemy lands and plunder. In the end, the renewed attack failed with interventions by the leading naval powers of England and the Dutch Republic. Charles' plans to subdue Denmark were thwarted and Trøndelag and Bornholm were returned to Denmark in the Treaty of Copenhagen in 1660 while Sweden was allowed to keep the rest of its recent conquests.

Charles X died in February 1660 and was succeeded by a regency council—led by the queen mother Hedvig Eleonora—that ruled in the name of Charles XI who was only four at the time of his father's death. Sweden had come close to almost complete control over trade in the Baltic, but the war revealed the need to work against the formation of anti-Swedish alliances that included Denmark, especially with France, the most powerful state in Europe at the time. There were some successes in foreign policy with the anti-French 1668 Triple Alliance of England, Sweden, and the Dutch Republic.

While the Swedish policy was to avoid war and to consolidate its gains, Danish policy after 1660 was to seek an opportunity to regain its losses. Under the Oldenburg King Frederick III, the foreign policy was aimed at isolating Sweden while setting itself up in a favorable position in future wars. Denmark attempted to position itself in the alliances among the 17th century Europe great powers. Bourbon France and the Habsburg-dominated Holy Roman Empire competed for continental domination while the Dutch Republic and England fought several wars over naval hegemony. At the same time, Denmark sought to rid itself of the generous toll treaties it was forced to grant Dutch merchants after the Republic's assistance in the wars against Sweden. Attempts were made to ally with both England and France, but without success. In the Second Anglo-Dutch War (1665–1666) Denmark had to side with the Dutch at the Battle of Vågen, souring its relations with England. In 1670 France allied with England against the Republic. Sweden's relations with France had improved greatly and in 1672 it joined the Anglo-French coalition, pushing Denmark into the Dutch camp.

In 1672, French King Louis XIV launched an attack on the Dutch Republic, igniting the Franco-Dutch War. The attack was opposed by the Holy Roman Empire led by Leopold I. In 1674, Sweden was pressured into joining the war by attacking the Republic's northern German allies. France promised to pay Sweden desperately needed war subsidies only on the condition that it moved in force on Brandenburg. A Swedish army of around 22,000 men under Carl Gustaf Wrangel advanced into Brandenburg in December 1674 and suffered a minor tactical defeat at the Battle of Fehrbellin in June 1675. Though not militarily significant, the defeat tarnished the reputation of near-invincibility that Sweden had enjoyed since the Thirty Years' War and emboldened its enemies. By September 1675, Denmark, the Dutch Republic, the Holy Roman Empire and Spain were all joined in war against Sweden and its ally France.

=== Scanian War ===
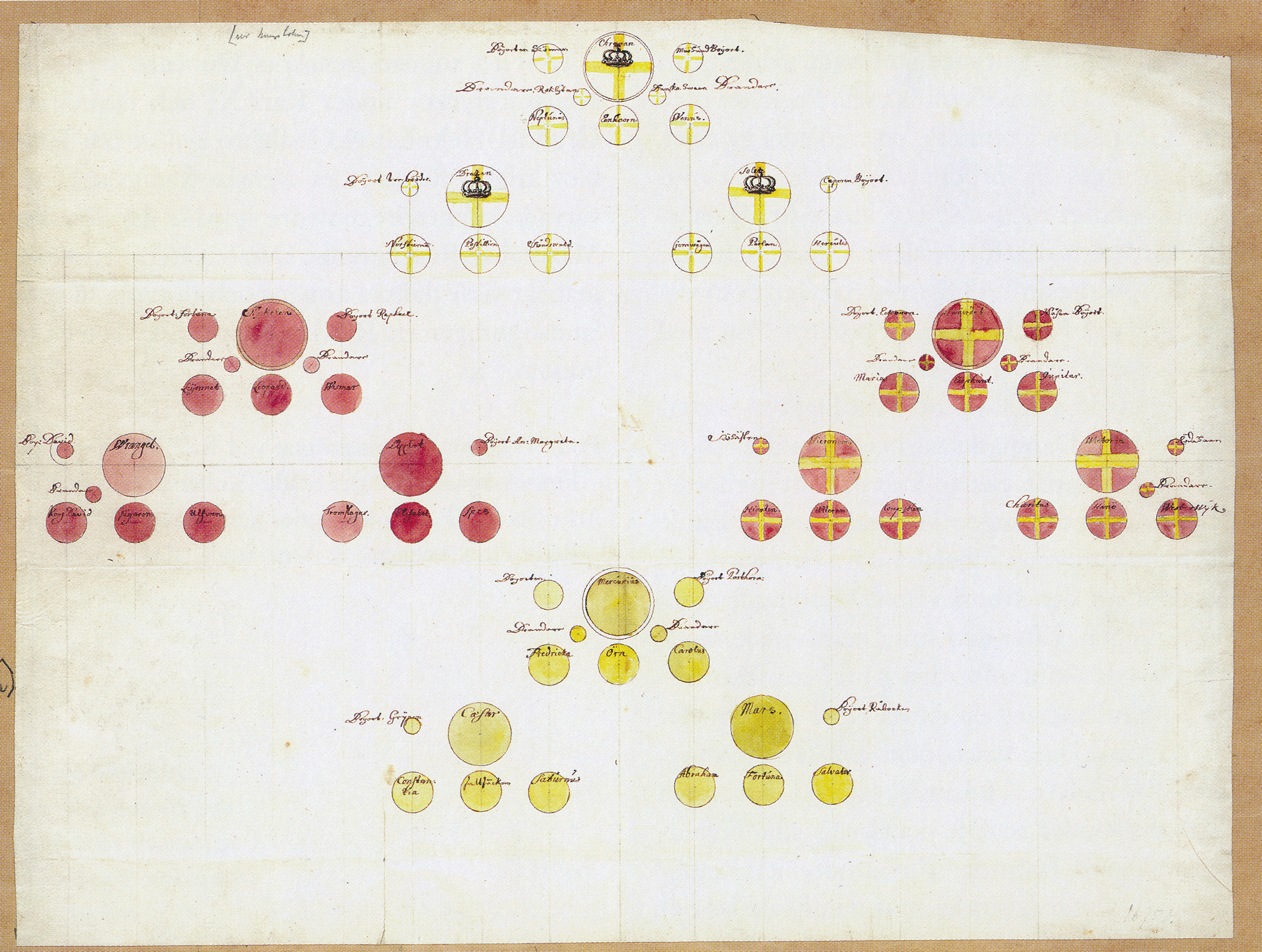
Sailing order for the Swedish fleet in late 1675. The illustration shows that the Swedish navy had not adapted to the realities of the line of battle. It still followed the patterns of "melee tactics" where small groups of ships acted individually, aiming for close combat and boarding.

With the declaration of war against Sweden on 2 September 1675, Denmark saw a chance to regain its recently lost eastern provinces. The southern Baltic became an important strategic theatre for both Denmark and Sweden. Denmark needed the sea lanes to invade Scania, and Sweden needed to reinforce Swedish Pomerania on the Baltic coast; both stood to gain by taking control of the Baltic trade routes. As war broke out between Denmark and Sweden a strong naval presence also became essential for Sweden to secure its interests at home and overseas.

In October 1675 the Swedish fleet under Gustaf Otto Stenbock put to sea, but sailed no further than Stora Karlsö off Gotland before it had to turn back to Stockholm after less than two weeks, beset by cold and stormy weather, disease, and the loss of vital equipment. Stenbock, held personally responsible for the failure by King Charles XI, was forced to pay for the campaign out of his own pocket. During the winter of 1675–1676 the Swedish fleet was placed under the command of Lorentz Creutz, who attempted to put to sea in January to February 1676, but was iced in by exceptionally cold weather.

== State of the fleets ==
The First Anglo-Dutch War (1652–1654) saw the development of the line of battle, a tactic where ships formed a continuous line to fire broadsides at an enemy. Previously, decisive action in naval engagements had been achieved through boarding and melee, but after the middle of the 17th century tactical doctrine focused more on disabling or sinking an opponent through superior firepower from a distance. This entailed major changes in military doctrines, shipbuilding, and professionalism in European navies from the 1650s onwards. The line of battle favored very large ships that could hold the line in the face of heavy fire, later known as ships of the line. The new tactics also depended on the ability of strong, centralized governments to maintain large, permanent fleets led by a professional officer corps. The increased power of the state at the expense of individual landowners led to the expansion of armies and navies, and in the late 1660s Sweden embarked on an expansive shipbuilding program.

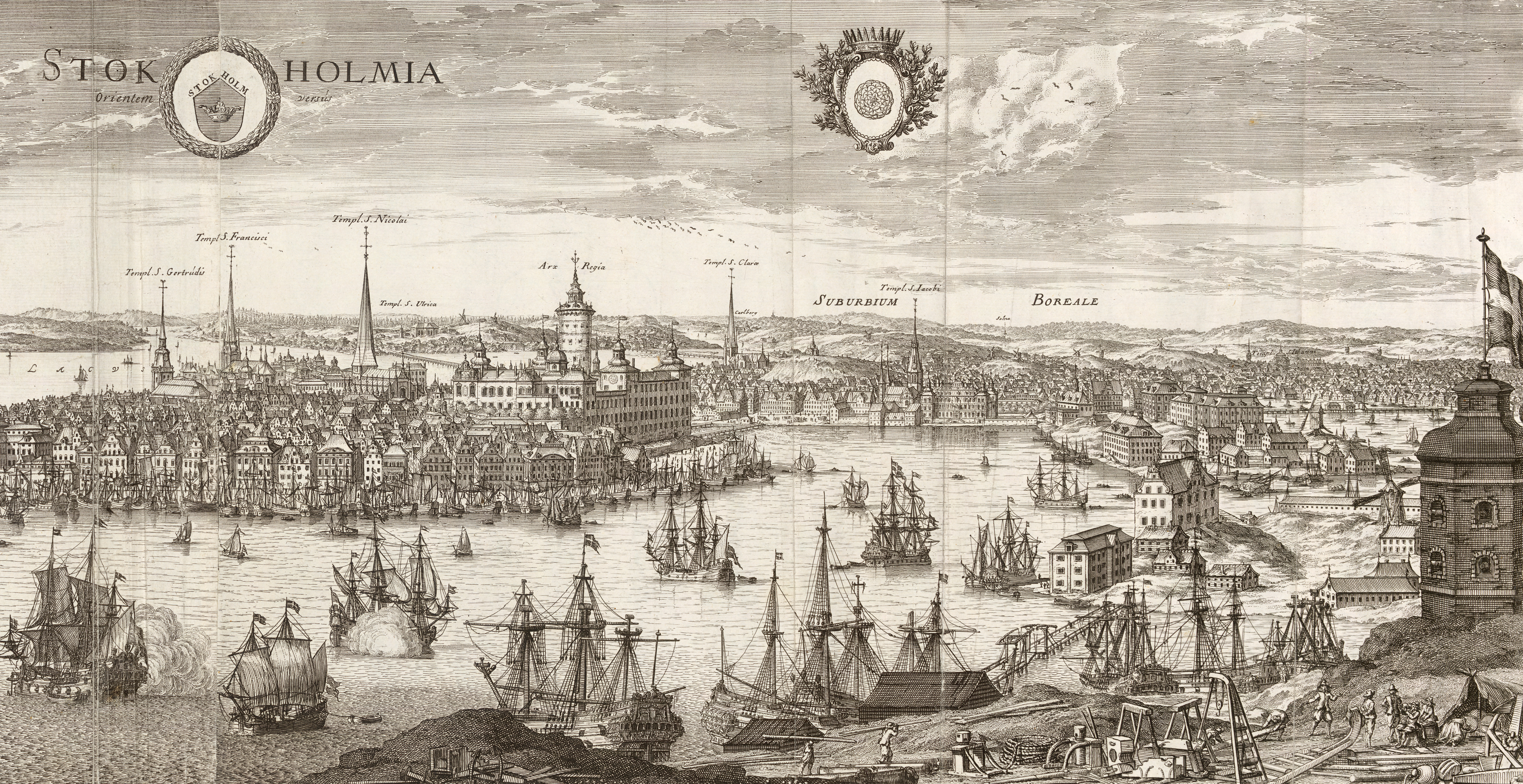
Detail of engraving of Stockholm from Suecia antiqua et hodierna by Erik Dahlberg and Willem Swidde, printed in 1693. The view shows the Swedish capital as a bustling port, and in the foreground the peak of Kastellholmen next to the royal shipyards on Skeppsholmen.

In 1675, the Swedish fleet was numerically superior to its Danish counterpart (18 ships of the line against 16 and 21 frigates against 11), but it was older and of poorer quality than the Danish fleet, which had replaced a larger proportion of its vessels. The Swedes had problems with routine maintenance, and both rigging and sails were generally in poor condition. Swedish crews lacked the professionalism of Danish and Norwegian sailors, who commonly had valuable experience from service in the Dutch merchant navy, and the Swedish navy also lacked a core of professional officers. The Danish had seasoned veterans like Cort Adeler and Niels Juel. The Danish fleet was also reinforced with Dutch units under the command Philip van Almonde and Cornelis Tromp, the latter an experienced officer who had served under Michiel de Ruyter, famous for his skilled command during the Anglo-Dutch Wars.

== Prelude ==
A Danish fleet of 20 ships under Admiral Niels Juel put to sea in March 1676, and on 29 April his forces landed on Gotland, which surrendered. The Swedish fleet was ordered out on 4 May with 23 warships of over 50 guns, 21 of less than 50 and 16 minor supporting vessels manned by about 12,000 men, but encountered adverse winds and was delayed until 19 May. Juel had by then left Visby, the main port on Gotland, to join up with a smaller Danish-Dutch force at Bornholm, between the southern tip of Sweden and the northern coast of Germany. Together they intended to cruise between Scania and the island of Rügen to stop Swedish troops from landing on the island and reinforcing Swedish Pomerania. On 25–26 May the two fleets fought the indecisive battle at Bornholm. The Swedish force was superior in numbers but was unable to inflict any serious losses, and two of the fleet's fireships were captured, one by the allies and the other by a Brandenburg squadron headed for Copenhagen.

Cornelis Tromp in 1675

Several Swedish accounts say that Creutz argued with his officers after Bornholm. Major Taube of the Mars testified that after the battle, the officers had been "scolded like boys" and that Creutz, "without regard for guilt or innocence, accused them almost all alike". The army captain Rosenberg told a later inquiry that Creutz "almost had a paroxysm in the night" over the conduct of Johan Bär (one of his flag officers) at Bornholm, and that he swore "never to go to serve at sea with such rascals". Maritime archaeologist Lars Einarsson has concluded that the relationship between Creutz and his subordinates had hit rock bottom before the battle.

After the unsuccessful action the Swedish fleet anchored off Trelleborg, where King Charles was waiting with new orders to recapture Gotland. The fleet was to refuse combat with the allies at least until they reached the northern tip of Öland, where they could fight in friendly waters. After the Swedish fleet left Trelleborg on 30 May, the allied fleet soon came in contact with it and began pursuing the Swedes. By this time the allies had been reinforced by a small squadron and now totaled 42 vessels, with 25 large or medium ships of the line. The reinforcements also brought with them a new commander, Admiral General Cornelis Tromp, one of the ablest naval tacticians of his time. Tromp, who also was a Lieutenant-Admiral in the Dutch navy, was made Admiral-General of the Danish navy on 8 May 1676. The two fleets sailed north and on 1 June passed the southern tip of Öland in a strong gale. The rough winds were hard on the Swedish ships. Many lost masts and spars. The Swedes, forming a barely cohesive battle line, tried to sail ahead of Tromp's ships, hoping to get between them and the shore, thus putting themselves on the allied fleet's windward side and gaining the tactical advantage of holding the weather gage. The Dutch ships of the allied fleet managed to sail closer to the wind and faster than the rest of the force, and slipped between the Swedes and the coast, snatching the weather gage. Later that morning the two fleets closed on each other, and were soon within firing range.

== Battle ==
Around noon, as a result of poor coordination and signaling, the Swedish line unexpectedly turned toward the allied fleet. When the flagship Kronan came about in the maneuver it suddenly heeled over and began to take in water. According to master gunner Anders Gyllenspak, the sails were not reefed and the ship leaned over so hard that water flooded in through the lower gunports. As the ship was leaning over, a gust of wind pushed the ship on her side, bringing her masts and sails down in line with the surface of the sea. Shortly afterwards, the gunpowder store exploded and ripped the forward section of the starboard side apart. Kronan quickly lost buoyancy and sank, taking most of her 850-man crew with her.

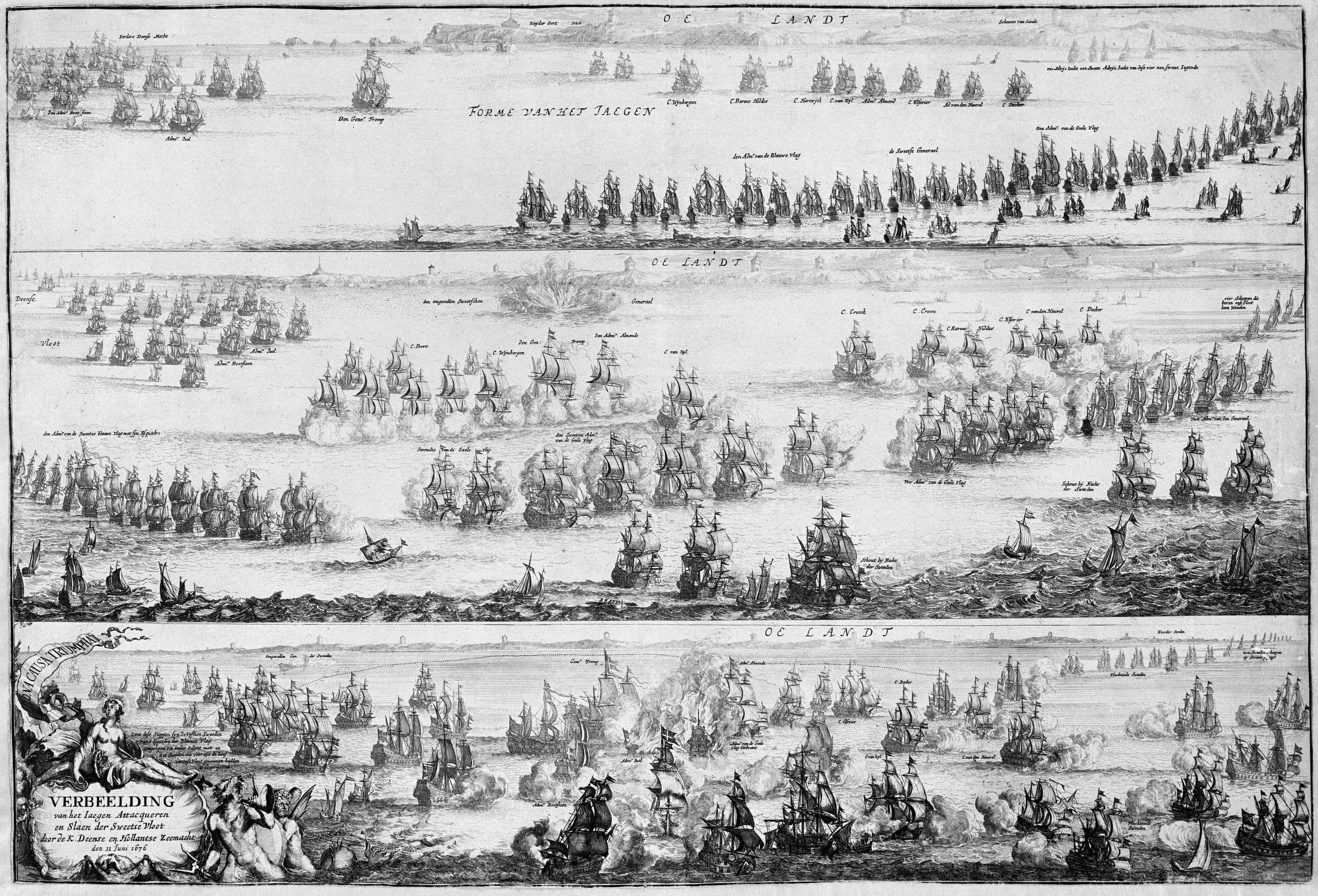
A contemporary depiction that divides the battle into three phases: (1) the two fleets sailing northwards along the coast of Öland, just passing the southern tip of Öland, (2) Kronan exploding and Svärdet surrounded, and (3) the Swedish fleet fleeing in disorder, pursued by allied ships. Copper engraving by Romeyn de Hooghe, 1676.

The sudden loss of the flagship and the fleet admiral threw the already scattered Swedish line into confusion and sapped morale. Four ships from Creutz's and Uggla's squadrons immediately fled when they saw that the flagship was lost. Claes Uggla was next in command after Creutz and became the acting commander of the Swedish fleet. When the line came about, Uggla and his ship Svärdet came on a collision course with the still floating wreckage of Kronan, and were forced to jibe (turn the stern into the wind direction) to avoid it. Svärdet's second turn was interpreted by many ships as a signal to turn again; others interpreted it as the beginning of a general retreat, leading to major disorder. Uggla reduced speed in an attempt to gather his forces, but instead was separated from his squadron.

Tromp on Christianus Quintus, Vice Admiral Jens Rodsten on Tre Løver and Niels Juel on Churprindsen took advantage of the chaos. They quickly surrounded Svärdet and three supporting ships (Hieronymus, Neptunus and Järnvågen, an armed merchantman) and began to hammer them into submission. Several other Swedish vessels attempted to assist Uggla, but they were in a lee position and could not provide effective support. After about an hour-and-a-half to two hours of hard fighting Svärdet's mainmast went overboard and Uggla had to surrender to Tromp. Despite this, Svärdet was ignited by accident or misunderstanding by the Dutch fireship 't Hoen. The second largest Swedish ship after Kronan sank in the blaze and took with it 600 out of a crew of 650, including Admiral Uggla himself. Only Hieronymus escaped the assault by the allied admirals, though badly damaged, and the others were captured by Juel on Churprindsen together with one of his lieutenants on Anna Sophia.

By six o'clock in the evening the Swedes had lost two flagships along with two fleet admirals, including the supreme commander of the navy. The entire force now began a disorderly retreat: the smaller ships Enhorn, Ekorren, Gripen and Sjöhästen were outsailed and captured and the rest of the ships sought shelter in friendly harbors. Most set course for Dalarö, north of Stockholm; others tried for Kalmar Strait, between Öland and the Swedish mainland. The allied fleet tried to capitalize further on its victory by giving chase, but the dash up the coast had scattered its forces and there was disagreement among the Danish commanders on how far they should pursue the Swedish ships.

== Aftermath ==
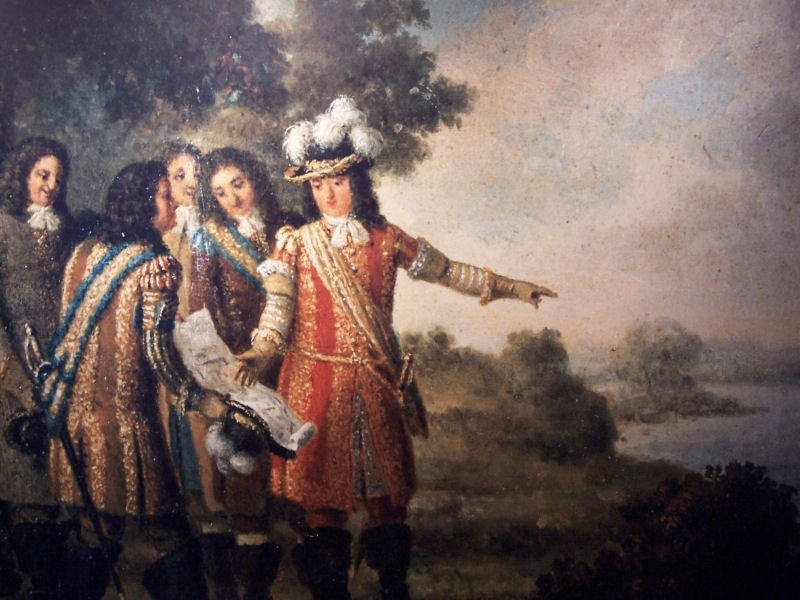
Charles XI pointing to the spot of the new main naval base of the Swedish navy, what would later become the town of Karlskrona; painting by Pehr Hilleström

The Swedish fleet had suffered a major blow by losing its two largest ships, its commander-in-chief and one of its most experienced admirals. Even after the battle, the misfortunes continued. Äpplet came off its moorings at Dalarö, went aground and sank. Around fifty survivors were picked up by pursuing Danish ships and taken as prisoners to Copenhagen. The battle gave Denmark undisputed naval supremacy and the Swedish fleet did not dare to venture out for the rest of the year. The army that had been amassed in Denmark could now be shipped to Scania to take the war to Swedish soil and on 29 June 1676, 14,500 troops were landed at Råå south of Helsingborg. The Battle of Öland was the first major Swedish defeat at sea to Denmark and was followed by further Swedish defeats at Møn and Køge Bay in 1677. The latter was a resounding success for Admiral Niels Juel and has become the most celebrated victory in Danish naval history.

The Battle of Öland was the first of several major Swedish defeats at sea that ended in complete Danish dominance over the southern Baltic for the duration of the Scanian War. That the main naval base in Stockholm was locked in ice during the winter of 1675–76 showed the necessity of an ice-free harbor that was closer to Danish home waters. In 1679, King Charles personally chose the site for a new base at what would later become Karlskrona. The lessons from the war also led to improvements in Swedish naval organization under the guidance of Hans Wachtmeister (1641–1714) which included better funding and maintenance, increased readiness for mobilization in the southern Baltic and permanent recruitment of skilled personnel through the allotment system.

=== Swedish commission ===
Within a week, the news of the failure at Bornholm and the major defeat at Öland reached King Charles, who immediately ordered that a commission be set up to investigate what had happened. Charles wanted to see if Bär and other officers were guilty of cowardice or incompetence. On 13 June, the King wrote "some of our sea officers have shown such cowardly and careless behavior" that they have "placed the safety, welfare and defense of the kingdom at great peril", and that "such a serious crime should be severely punished".

The commission began its work on 7 June 1676. At the hearings, strong criticism surfaced and was directed against individual officers as well as Swedish conduct in general. Anders Homman, one of the officers on Svärdet, was among those who chastised his colleagues the hardest. In his testimony he said that Admiral Uggla had exclaimed "look how those dog cunts run" when he was surrounded, fighting the allied flagships. Homman himself described the actions of his colleagues as those of "chickens running about the yard, each in his own direction", and added that he "had been in seven battles, but had never seen our people fight so poorly".

The commission did not find anyone guilty of negligence or misconduct, but Lieutenant Admiral Bär, commander of Nyckeln, and Lieutenant Admiral Christer Boije, who had run aground on Äpplet, were never again given a command in the navy. Lieutenant Admiral Hans Clerck, commander of Solen, went through the process unscathed, and was promoted to full Admiral by the King before the commission even presented its verdict. Creutz has quite consistently been blamed for the loss of his ship by historians, and has been described as an incompetent sea officer and sailor who more or less single-handedly brought about the sinking through lack of naval experience. Military historians Lars Ericson Wolke and Olof Sjöblom have attempted to nuance the picture by pointing out that Creutz's task was akin to that of an administrator rather than a military commander. The practical issues of ship maneuvering should have been the responsibility of his subordinates, who had experience in naval matters.

=== Disputes among the allied officers ===
Despite the victories, several allied officers were displeased with the conduct of their forces. Naval historian Jørgen Barfod explains that the battle was fought "in a disorganized manner from beginning to end" since Tromp had given the order for each commander to attack the enemy ship closest to him. Most of the Danish fleet was unable to keep pace with the faster Dutch ships, so the race for an advantageous position along the coast had contributed to the scattering of the allied fleet. Juel later complained in a letter to the Danish Admiral of the Realm that the Dutch had not assisted him in pursuing the fleeing Swedes. He claimed that if he had received proper support, they could have "brought [the Swedes] such a fever on their throats that it would take years for all the doctors in Stockholm to cure it". When Tromp sent a report of the battle to the Danish King he reproached his subordinates, but not by name, and asked that no punishment be dealt out.

The captain of 't Hoen, the fireship that had set Svärdet ablaze after she had surrendered, was arrested and incarcerated directly after the battle, and was subjected to such harsh treatment that he died within a few days. Tromp later reported that his ship Delft, which had seen some of the roughest fighting, had lost around 100 men and that most of its officers were wounded.

== Forces ==
Below is a list of the ships that participated in the battle. The figures in parentheses indicate the number of guns for each ship.

=== Allied fleet ===
First squadron

Flagship: Churprindsen (68), Niels Juel

- Christianus IV (58)
- Gyldenløve (56)
- Anna Sophia (62)
- Delmenhorst (44)
- Nellebladet (54)
- Lindormen (46)
- København (36)
- Hommeren (32)
- Anthonette (26)
- Caritas (34)
- Fire Kronede Lillier (4)
- Stokfisken, Abrahams Offer (fireships)

Second squadron

Flagship: Christianus V (80), Cornelis Tromp

- Tre Løver (64)
- Oostergoo (60)
- Charlotta Amalie (64)
- Enighed (66)
- Fridericus III (64)
- Campen (44)
- Havmanden (36)
- Havfruen (26)
- Spraglede Falk (18)
- Louys, 't Hoen (fireships)

Third squadron

Flagship: Delft (62), Philips van Almonde

- Waesdorp (68)
- Dordrecht (46)
- Ackerboom (60)
- Gideon (60)
- Justina (64)
- Noortholland (44)
- Caleb (40)
- Utrecht (38)
- Hvide Falk (26)
- Delft (28)
- Perlen (8)
- Leonora (fireship)

=== Swedish fleet ===
First squadron

Flagship: Kronan (124), Lorentz Creutz

- Solen (74)
- Wrangel (60)
- Draken (66)
- Herkules (56)
- Neptunus (44)
- Maria (44)
- Fenix (36)
- Sundsvall (32)
- Enhorn (16)
- Pärlan (28, armed merchantman)
- Tre Bröder (12)
- Mjöhund (10)
- Sjöhästen (8)
- Jakob, Svan (fireships)

Second squadron

Flagship: Svärdet (94), Claes Uggla

- Mars (72)
- Merkurius (64)
- Hieronymus (64)
- Svenska Lejonet (48)
- Göteborg (48)
- Fredrika Amalia (34)
- Uttern (24)
- Flygande Vargen (44, armed merchantman)
- Järnvågen (24, armed merchantman)
- Ekorren (8)
- Posthornet (8)
- Råbocken (8)
- Rödkritan, Duvan (fireships)

Third squadron

Flagship: Nyckeln (84), Johan Bär

- Äpplet (86)
- Saturnus (64)
- Caesar (60)
- Wismar (54)
- Riga (54)
- Hjorten (36)
- Solen (54, armed merchantman)
- Salvator (30)
- Gripen (8)
- Sjöman (8)
- Postiljon (fireship)

Fourth squadron

- Victoria (80)
- Venus (64)
- Jupiter (70)
- Carolus (60)
- Spes (48)
- Abraham (44)
- Nordstjärnan (28)
- Trumslagaren (34, armed merchantman)
- Konung David (32, armed merchantman)
- Elisabeth (12, armed merchantman)
- Fortuna (12)
- Måsen (8)
- Jägaren (fireship)
