= Svärdet =

Swedish warship (1660–1662)

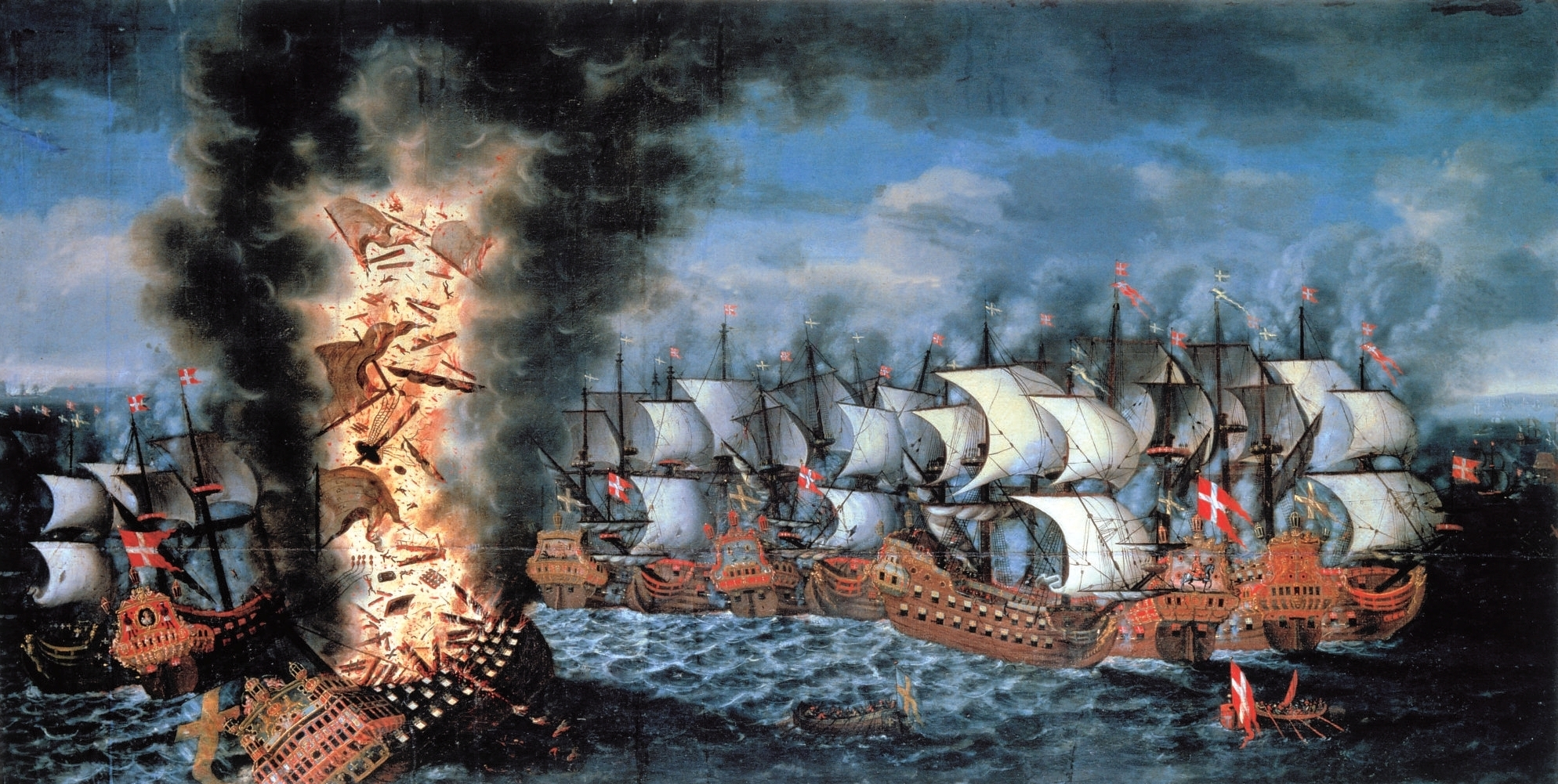
- c. 1686 painting by Claus Møinichen the Battle of Öland. Svärdet is the rightmost Swedish ship, with two Danish ships on either side of her.

History

Sweden
- Name: Svärdet
- Ordered: c. 1660
- Laid down: 1662
- In service: 1663–1676
- Fate: Sunk in Battle of Öland, 1676

General characteristics
- Class & type: Regalskepp
- Displacement: 1700 tons
- Length: 47.5 m (155 ft 10 in)
- Beam: 12.5 m (41 ft)
- Draught: 5.94 m (19 ft 6 in)
- Troops: 220
- Complement: 400
- Armament: 86 guns; Lower gun deck; 12 × 36-pounders; 4 × 30-pounders; 14 × 24-pounders; Upper gun deck; 26 × 12-pounders; 4 × 8-pounders; Weather deck; 20 × 8-pounders; 6 × 3-pounders

Svärdet (Swedish: "the sword") was a Swedish warship that sank on 1 June 1676 at the Battle of Öland during the Scanian War, with most of its crew.

== History ==
Svärdet was, during the Scanian War, under the command of Claes Uggla, and fought in the Battle of Öland. She was surrounded early in the battle, and fought for two hours until her main mast was destroyed and the ship surrendered. Before the surrounding enemies could board Svärdet, a Dutch fireship accidentally set her ablaze. The fire eventually reached the gunpowder store, which set off an explosion that sank the ship. Only about 50 of a crew of nearly 650 men survived.

On 15 November 2011, it was announced that a wreck believed to be Svärdet had been found by divers off the island coast of Öland.

== General characteristics ==
- Displacement: 1700 tons
- Length: 47.5 meters
- Width: 12.5 meters
- Armament: 86 cannons
  - 12 36-pounders (lower gun deck)
  - 4 30-pounders (lower gun deck)
  - 14 24-pounders (lower gun deck)
  - 26 12-pounders (upper gun deck)
  - 4 8-pounders (upper gun deck)
  - 20 8-pounders (weather deck)
  - 6 3-pounders (weather deck)
- Crew: 650 (both sailors and soldiers)

== See also ==
- Vasa, a Swedish warship which foundered and sank in 1628, was rediscovered in 1956, and was subsequently recovered
- Kronan, a Swedish warship that foundered in rough weather in 1676, was rediscovered in 1980, with artefacts on display in Kalmar County Museum
- Mars, a Swedish warship which sank in 1564, and was rediscovered in 2011, and is under active exploration
