= Kronan (ship) =

Swedish Navy ship of the 1670s

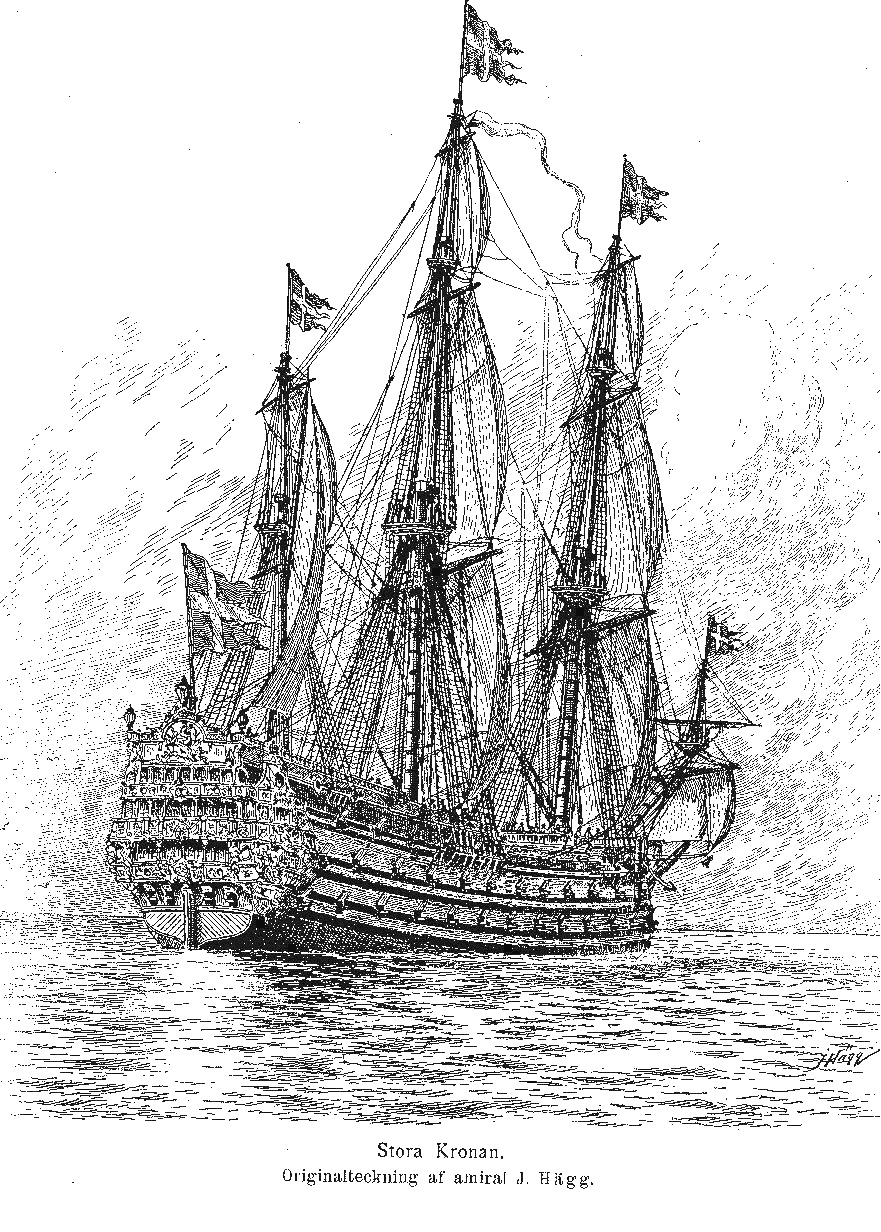
- Reconstruction by Jacob Hägg, 1909

History

Sweden
- Name: Kronan
- Namesake: Royal crown of Sweden
- Builder: Francis Sheldon, Stockholm
- Laid down: October 1665
- Launched: 31 July 1668
- Commissioned: 1672
- Fate: Sunk at the Battle of Öland, 1 June 1676 56°26′58″N 16°40′20″E

General characteristics
- Type: Ship of the line
- Displacement: 2,300 tonnes (approximate)
- Length: 53 m (174 ft)
- Beam: 12.9 m (42 ft)
- Height: 66 m (217 ft, keel to mast)
- Draft: 6.2–6.8 m (20–22 ft)
- Sail plan: ship rig
- Troops: 300 soldiers
- Complement: 500 sailors
- Armament: Planned for 126 guns from 6 to 36 pounds; Actual armament c. 105–114 guns

Kronan, also called Stora Kronan, was a Swedish warship that served as the flagship of the Swedish Navy in the Baltic Sea in the 1670s. When built, the ship was one of the largest seagoing vessels in the world. The construction of Kronan lasted from 1668 to 1672 and was delayed by difficulties with financing and conflicts between the shipwright Francis Sheldon and the Swedish admiralty. After four years of service, the ship sank in rough weather at the Battle of Öland on 1 June 1676: while making a sharp turn under too much sail she capsized, and the gunpowder magazine ignited and blew off most of the bow. Kronan sank quickly, taking about 800 men and more than 100 guns with her, along with valuable military equipment, weapons, personal items, and large quantities of silver and gold coins.

The loss of Kronan was a heavy blow for Sweden during the Scanian War. Besides being the largest and most heavily armed ship in the Swedish Navy, she had been an important status symbol for the monarchy of the young Charles XI. Along with Kronan, the navy lost a sizeable proportion of its best manpower, acting supreme commander Lorentz Creutz, numerous high-ranking fleet officers, and the chief of the navy medical staff. A commission was set up to investigate whether any individuals could be held responsible for the defeat at the Battle of Öland and other major defeats during the war.

Most of the guns that sank with Kronan were salvaged in the 1680s, but eventually the wreck fell into obscurity. Its exact position was rediscovered in 1980 by the amateur researcher Anders Franzén, who had also located the 17th-century warship Vasa in the 1950s. Yearly diving operations have since surveyed and excavated the wreck site and salvaged artifacts, and Kronan has become the most widely publicized shipwreck in the Baltic after Vasa. More than 30,000 artifacts have been recovered, and many have been conserved and put on permanent public display at the Kalmar County Museum in Kalmar. The museum is responsible for the maritime archaeological operations and the permanent exhibitions on Kronan.

== Historical background ==
A map of Sweden's territorial gains and losses 1560–1815. Sweden was at its peak as a Baltic power in the years that Kronan served.

In the 1660s, Sweden was at its height as a European great power. It had defeated Denmark, one of its main competitors for hegemony in the Baltic, in both the Torstenson War (1643–1645) and the Dano-Swedish War (1657–58). At the treaties of Brömsebro (1645) and Roskilde (1658), Denmark had been forced to cede the islands of Gotland and Ösel, all of its eastern territories on the Scandinavian Peninsula, and parts of Norway. In a third war, from 1658 to 1660, King Charles X of Sweden attempted to finish off Denmark for good. The move was bold royal ambition in an already highly militarized society geared for warfare, a fiscal-military state. Disbanding its armies would have required paying outstanding wages, so there was an underlying incentive to keep hostilities alive and let the army live off enemy lands and plunder. The renewed attack on Denmark threatened the trade interests of the leading maritime nations of England and the Dutch Republic by upsetting the balance of power in the Baltic. The Dutch intervened in 1658 by sending a fleet to stop the attempt to crush Denmark. England also sent a fleet in November the same year, to assist Sweden in keeping the Sound Toll out of Danish and Dutch control. The English expedition failed as a result of adverse winter weather and the political turmoil that ended the Protectorate, and in the end, Charles' plans were thwarted.

Charles X died in February 1660. Three months later, the Treaty of Copenhagen ended the war. Charles' son and successor, Charles XI, was only five when his father died, so a regency council—led by the queen mother Hedvig Eleonora—assumed power until he came of age. Sweden had come close to control over trade in the Baltic, but the war revealed the need to prevent the formation of a powerful anti-Swedish alliance that included Denmark. There were some successes in foreign policy, notably the anti-French Triple Alliance of England, Sweden, and the Dutch Republic. By early 1672, Sweden had improved its relations with France enough to form an alliance. The same year, King Louis XIV attacked the Dutch Republic, and in 1674 Sweden was pressured into joining the war by attacking the republic's northern German allies. France promised to pay Sweden desperately-needed war subsidies on condition that it move in force on Brandenburg. A Swedish army of 22,000 men under Carl Gustaf Wrangel advanced into Brandenburg in December 1674 and suffered a minor tactical defeat at the Battle of Fehrbellin in June 1675. Though not militarily significant, the defeat tarnished the reputation of near-invincibility that Swedish arms had enjoyed since the Thirty Years' War. This emboldened Sweden's enemies, and by September 1675 Denmark, the Dutch Republic and the Holy Roman Empire were at war with Sweden and France.

=== State of the fleet ===
By 1675 the Swedish fleet was numerically superior to its Danish counterpart (18 ships of the line against 16, 21 frigates against 11), but the Swedish ships were generally older and of poorer quality than those of the Danish fleet, which had replaced a larger proportion of its vessels with more modern warships. The Swedish side also had problems with routine maintenance, and both rigging and sails were generally in poor condition. Swedish crews lacked the level of professionalism of Danish and Norwegian sailors, who often had experience from service in the Dutch merchant navy, and the Swedish Navy lacked a core of professional officers while the Danish had seasoned veterans like Cort Adeler and Nils Juel. The Danish fleet was reinforced with Dutch units under Philip van Almonde and Cornelis Tromp, the latter an experienced officer who had served under Michiel de Ruyter.

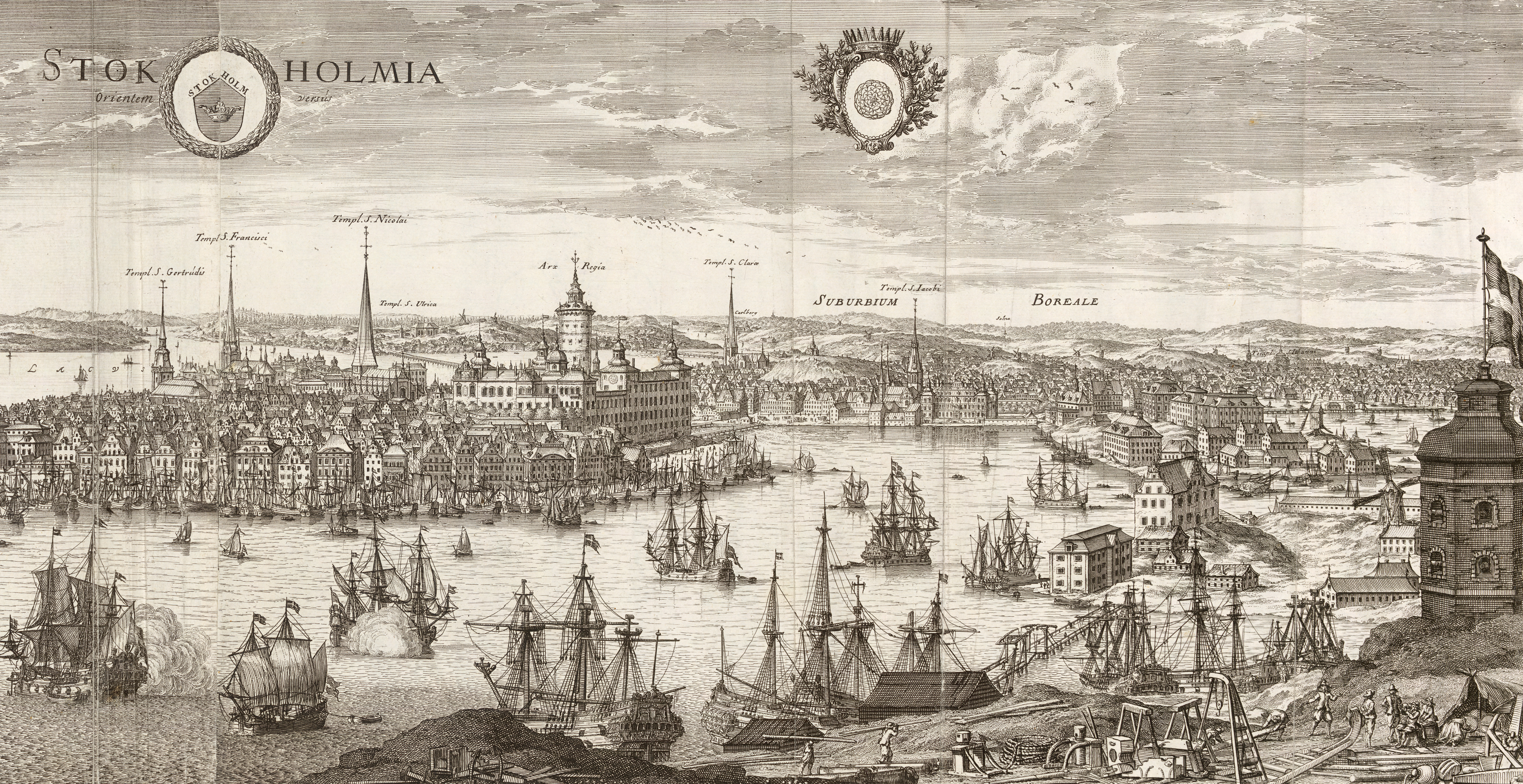
Detail of engraving of Stockholm from Suecia antiqua et hodierna by Erik Dahlberg and Willem Swidde, printed in 1693. The view shows the Swedish capital as a bustling port, and in the foreground the peak of Kastellholmen next to the royal shipyards on Skeppsholmen.

== Design ==
The First Anglo-Dutch War (1652–1654) saw the development of the line of battle, a tactic where ships formed a continuous line to fire broadsides at an enemy. Previously, naval tactics had favored short-range firepower and boarding with intent to take prizes. After the mid-17th century, improved gunnery caused tactics to shift from close-quarter fighting to disabling or sinking opponents through superior, long-distance firepower. This entailed major changes in doctrine, shipbuilding, and professionalism in European navies from the 1650s onwards. The line of battle favored large ships that were heavily armed and robust enough to hold the line in the face of enemy fire. The increased centralization and concentration of power in the emerging nation-states during the late 17th century allowed for a great expansion of armies and navies, and new government shipyards began building much much larger ships. Sweden embarked on an expansive shipbuilding program in the late 1660s.

Kronan was one of the most heavily armed warships in the world in 1672 when she was launched, a three-decker with 110 guns. The ship had three full gundecks with guns from bow to stern. Altogether there were seven separate levels, divided by six decks. Furthest down in the ship, above the keel, was the hold, and immediately above it, but still below the waterline, lay the orlop; both were used primarily for storage. Above the orlop were the three gundecks, two of them covered, while about half of the topmost gundeck was open to the elements in the ship's middle, or waist. The bow had one deck, making up the forecastle, and the stern had two decks, including a poop deck.

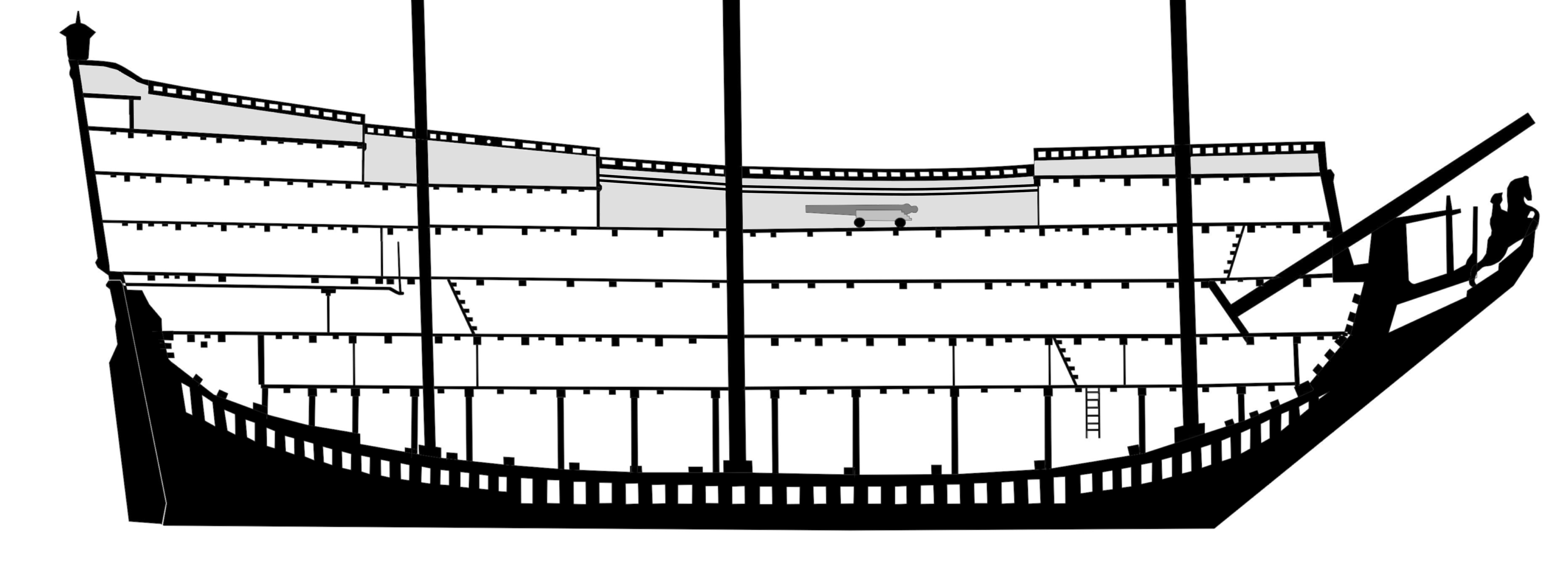
Diagram of Kronan's deck structure based on a model by the Kalmar County Museum

During the first half of the 17th century, Swedish warships were built in the Dutch manner, with a flat, rectangular bottom with a small draft. This shipbuilding style was adapted mainly for smaller ships in the shallow coastal waters of the Netherlands, and allowed for quick construction, but these less sturdy vessels were generally unsuitable as warships and somewhat unstable in rough seas. When Kronan was built, the English approach to building had prevailed, giving hulls a more rounded bottom and greater draft, as well as a sturdier frame and increased stability. The stern was more streamlined below the waterline, which lessened resistance.

The measurements for Kronan were recorded in contemporary navy lists. Her length from stem post to stern post was 53 m (174 ft); this was considerably shorter than the length if the bowsprit and beakhead were included. The width was 12.9 m (42 ft) and was defined as the widest point between the frames, excluding planking. The draft varied depending on how heavily she was laden, but with full stores, ammunition and armaments it would have been about 6.2–6.8 m (20–22 ft). The height of the ship from keel to the highest mast was never recorded, but Kalmar County Museum has estimated it to have been at least 66 m (217 ft).

Kronan's displacement – the ship's weight calculated by how much water she displaced while floating – is not known precisely, since there are no exact records of the dimensions. By using contemporary documents describing the approximate measurements, it has been estimated at 2,300 tonnes. By her displacement in relation to the number and weight of guns, Kronan was over-gunned, though this was not uncommon for the era. European shipwrights had not been building three-deckers on a large scale before the 1650s; by the 1660s, designs were still quite experimental. Contemporary records show that English and French three-deckers tended to be rather unstable because they were built high, narrow and with too much artillery. Some English ships had to be reinforced with a "girdle" of built-up planking at the waterline to perform satisfactorily. In rough seas these ships could be forced to close the lowest row of gunports, depriving them of their heaviest and most effective guns. In these situations they were effectively just over-priced two-deckers. Kronan's construction was not inherently flawed; the ship handled harsh weather conditions in 1675 and again only a week before capsizing, but she could be dangerous if handled poorly. Later, during the 18th century, ships with the same weight of guns had more tonnage to support their guns, usually weighing 3,000–5,000 tonnes, which made them more stable. When Kronan was built, she was the third- or fourth-largest ship in the world, but as the trend moved towards ever greater ships, she was surpassed by other large warships. At the time Kronan sank, she was down to seventh place.

=== Armament ===
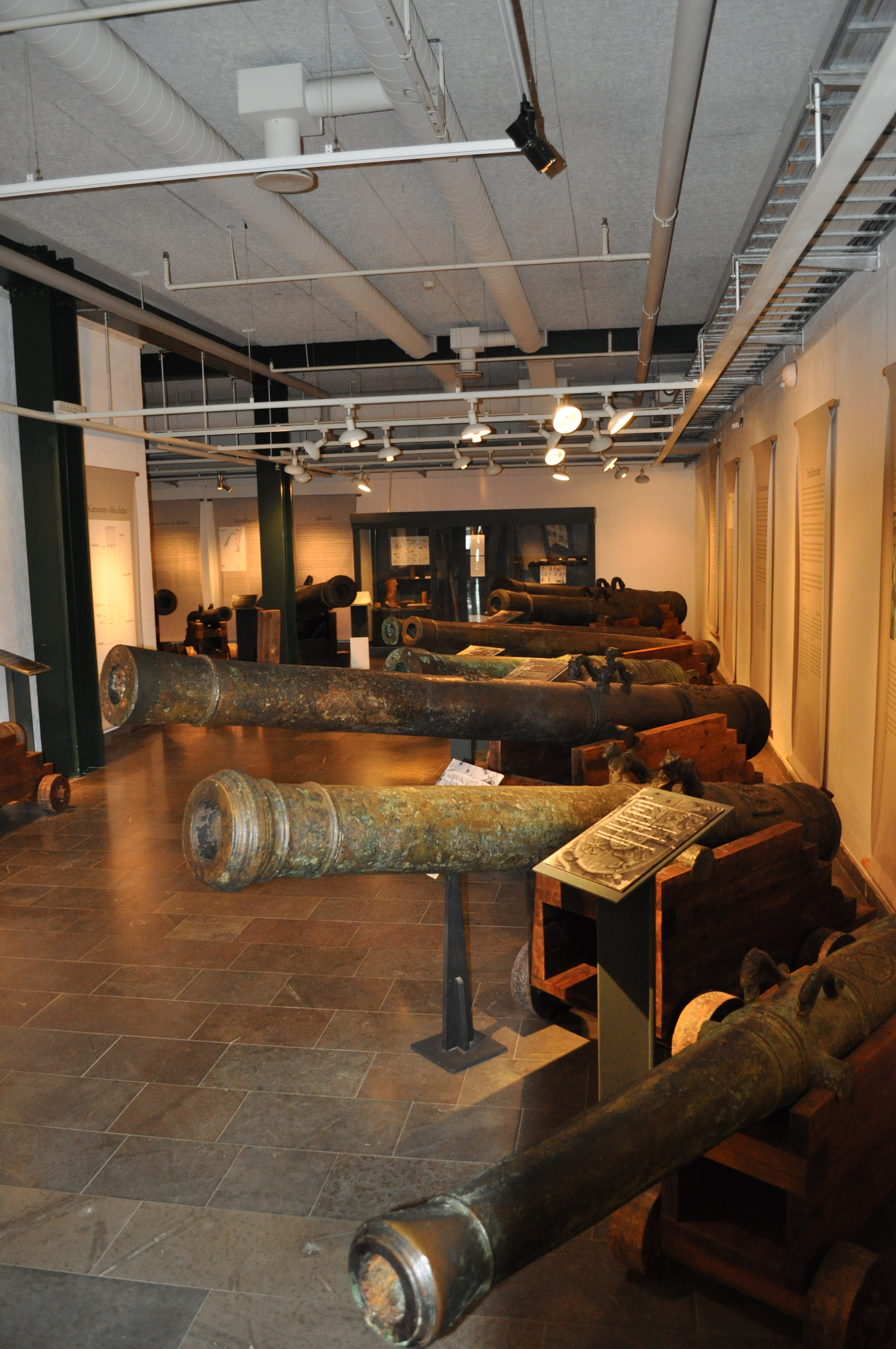
Salvaged cannons of various types from Kronan on display at Kalmar County Museum

According to the official armament plan Kronan was to be equipped with 124–126 guns; 34–36 guns on each of the gundecks and an additional 18 shared between forecastle and sterncastle decks. Guns were classed by the weight of the cannonballs they fired, varying between 3 and 36 pounds (1.36–16.3 kg). The guns themselves weighed from a few hundred kg (400–500 lbs) up to four tonnes (4.4 tons) with the heaviest pieces placed in the middle of the lower-most gundeck with successively lighter ones on the decks above. Kronan's most lethal weapons were the 30- and 36-pounders on the lowest gundeck which had a range and firepower that outclassed the armament of almost any other warship. The guns lighter than 18-pounders were primarily intended to inflict damage on the enemy's crew and rigging rather than the hull.

According to modern research, the number of guns was considerably less than the official armament plan. At the time, armament plans regularly overstated the number of guns available. In reality, they were ideal estimations that seldom reflected actual conditions, either because of a lack of ordnance or because they were impractical when tested. Heavy 30- and 36-pounder guns were particularly difficult to find in sufficient numbers and lighter guns were frequently used instead. Going by the number of guns salvaged from Kronan in the 1680s (see "History as a shipwreck") and during the excavations in the 1980s the total comes to 105–110. The upper figure matches the calculations of the number of gunports on the remains of the wreck and the number of guns that could practically fit on the gun decks. The lower figure is the number of guns found in the 1980s excavations combined with the list of guns brought up during the salvage operations in the 1680s. The table below lists the number of guns, comparing the official 1671 armament plan to the calculations by naval historian Jan Glete.

Distribution of guns
	1671 armament plan	Actual armament
Lower gun deck	12 36-pounders 16 30-pounders 4 24-pounders 2 18-pounders	8 36-pounders 8 30-pounders 10 24-pounders 4 long 24-pound chasers
Middle gun deck	36 24-pounders	4 heavy 24-pounders 16 light 24-pounders 6 heavy 12-pounders 4 long 12-pound stern chasers 2 8-pounders
Upper gun deck	36 light 12-pounders	10 heavy 12-pounders 10 light 12-pounders 2 10-pounders 2 8-pounders 2 heavy 6-pounders
Forecastle and sterncastle	20 6-pounders	16 6-pounders 6 3-pounders

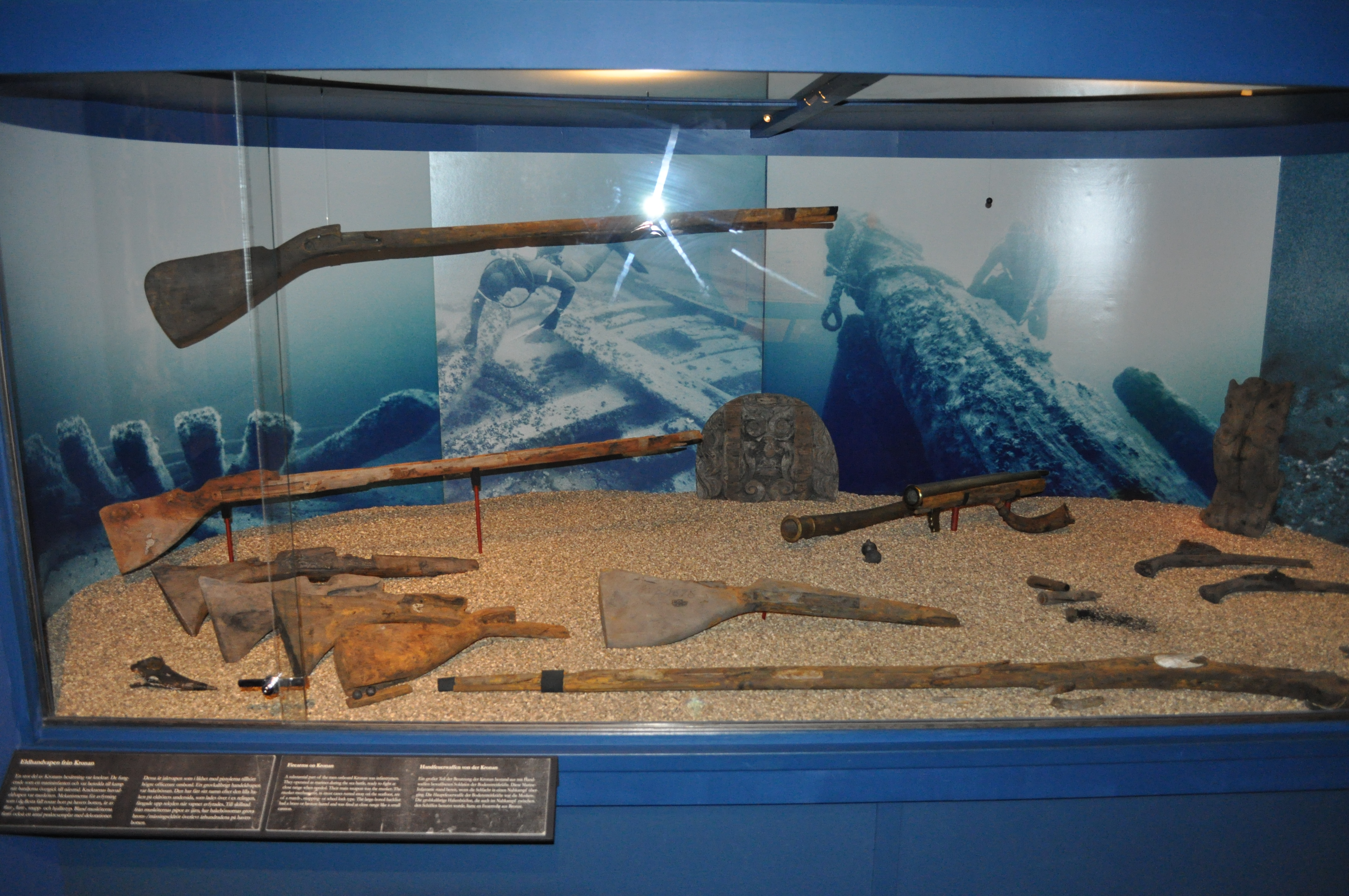
Firearms, including muskets, on display at Kalmar County Museum

Several types of ammunition were available, each for different uses: round shot (cannonballs) against ship hulls, chain shot against masts and rigging, and canister shot (wooden cylinders filled with metal balls or fragments), which had a devastating effect on tightly packed groups of men. For boarding actions Kronan was equipped with 130 muskets and 80 matchlock or flintlock pistols. For close combat there were 250 pikes, 200 boarding axes and 180 swords. During the excavations, large-caliber firearms were found – hakebössor, similar to blunderbusses; they were equipped with a small catch underneath the barrel which allowed them to be hooked over a railing to allow it to absorb the recoil of the charges. One hakebössa was still loaded with a small canister containing 20 lead balls that would have been used to clear enemy decks before boarding.

=== Ornamentation ===
Expensive and elaborate ornamentation was an important part of a ship's appearance in the 1660s, even though it had been simplified since the early 17th century. Such ornamentation was believed to enhance the authority of absolute monarchs and to portray the ship as a symbol of martial prowess and royal authority. There are no contemporary illustrations of the ornamentation of Kronan, but according to common practice it was most lavish on the transom, the flat surface facing aft. There are two images of Kronan shown from the stern by two Danish artists. Both works were commissioned many years after the sinking to commemorate the Danish victory. Claus Møinichen's painting at Fredriksborg Palace from 1686 shows a transom dominated by two lions rampant holding up a huge royal crown. The background is blue with sculptures and ornaments in gold. Swedish art historian Hans Soop, who has previously studied the sculptures of Vasa, a prestige ship of Gustavus Adolphus's navy that sank only 20 minutes into her maiden voyage in Stockholm in 1628, has suggested that Møinichen may have intentionally exaggerated the size of the ship to enhance the Danish victory. A tapestry at Rosenborg Castle shows Kronan as a two-decker with a crown motif that is even larger than Møinichen's painting.

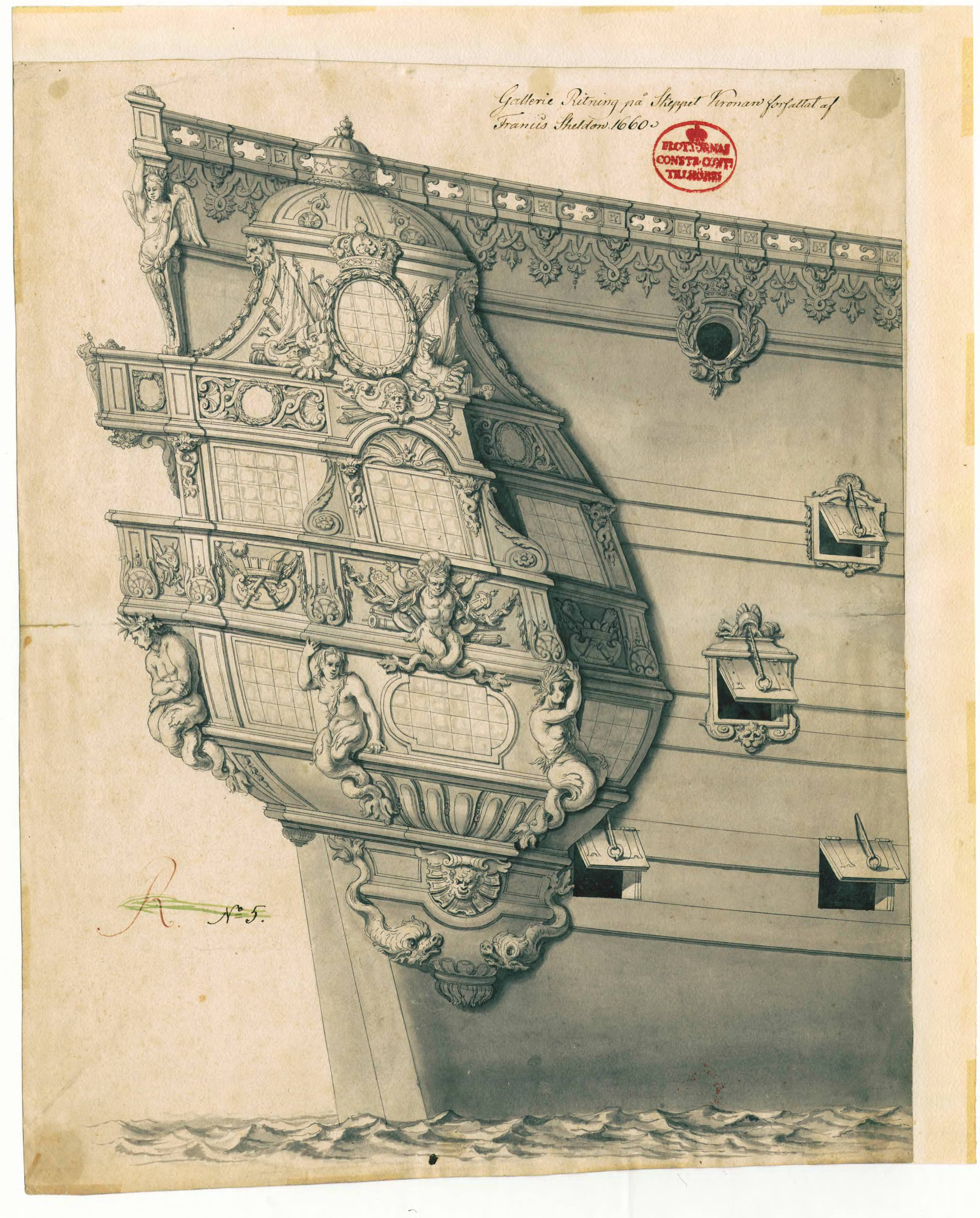
Starboard quarter gallery of Kronan, drawing by Francis Sheldon (1660)

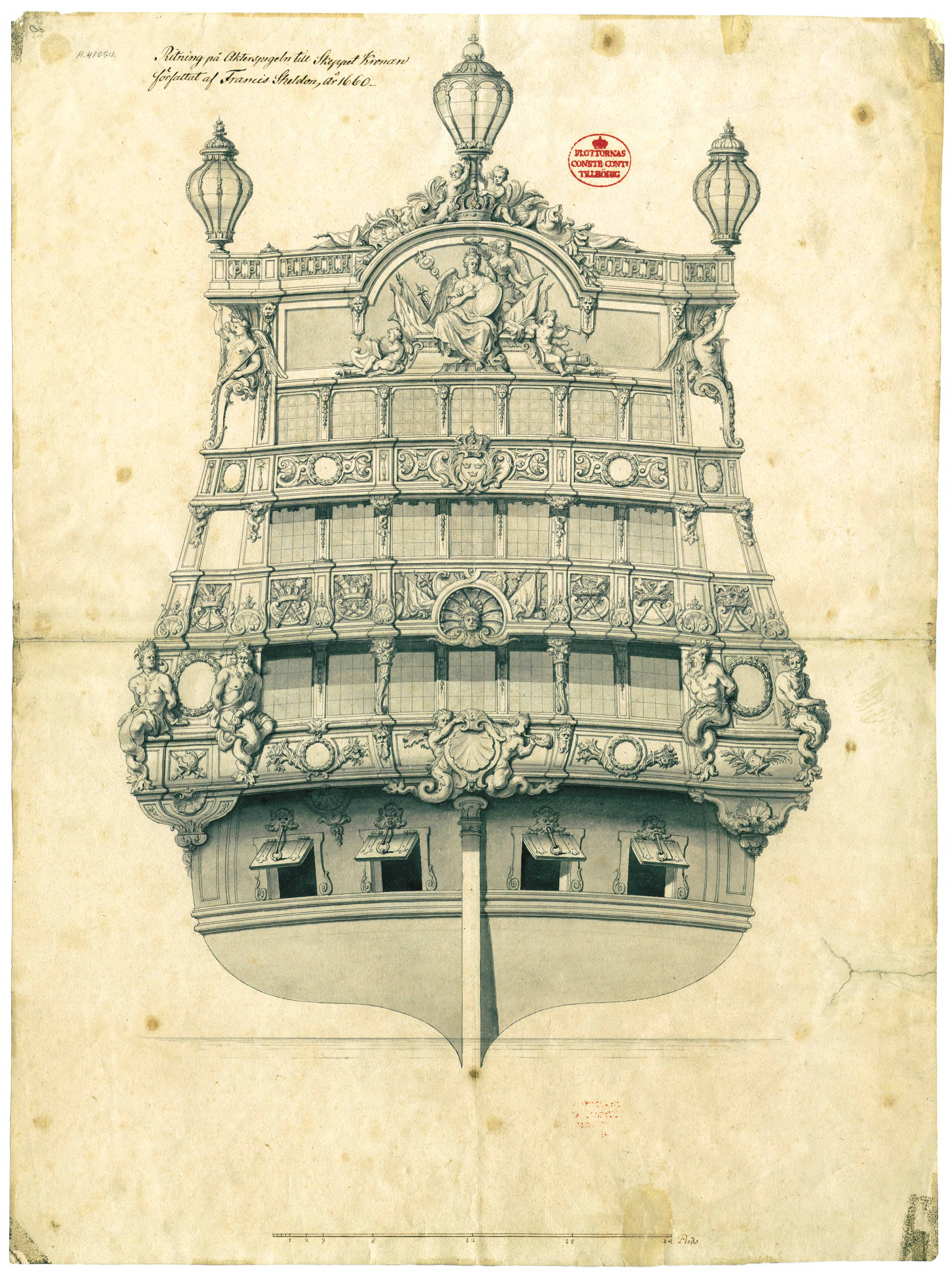
Transom of Kronan, drawing by Francis Sheldon (1660)

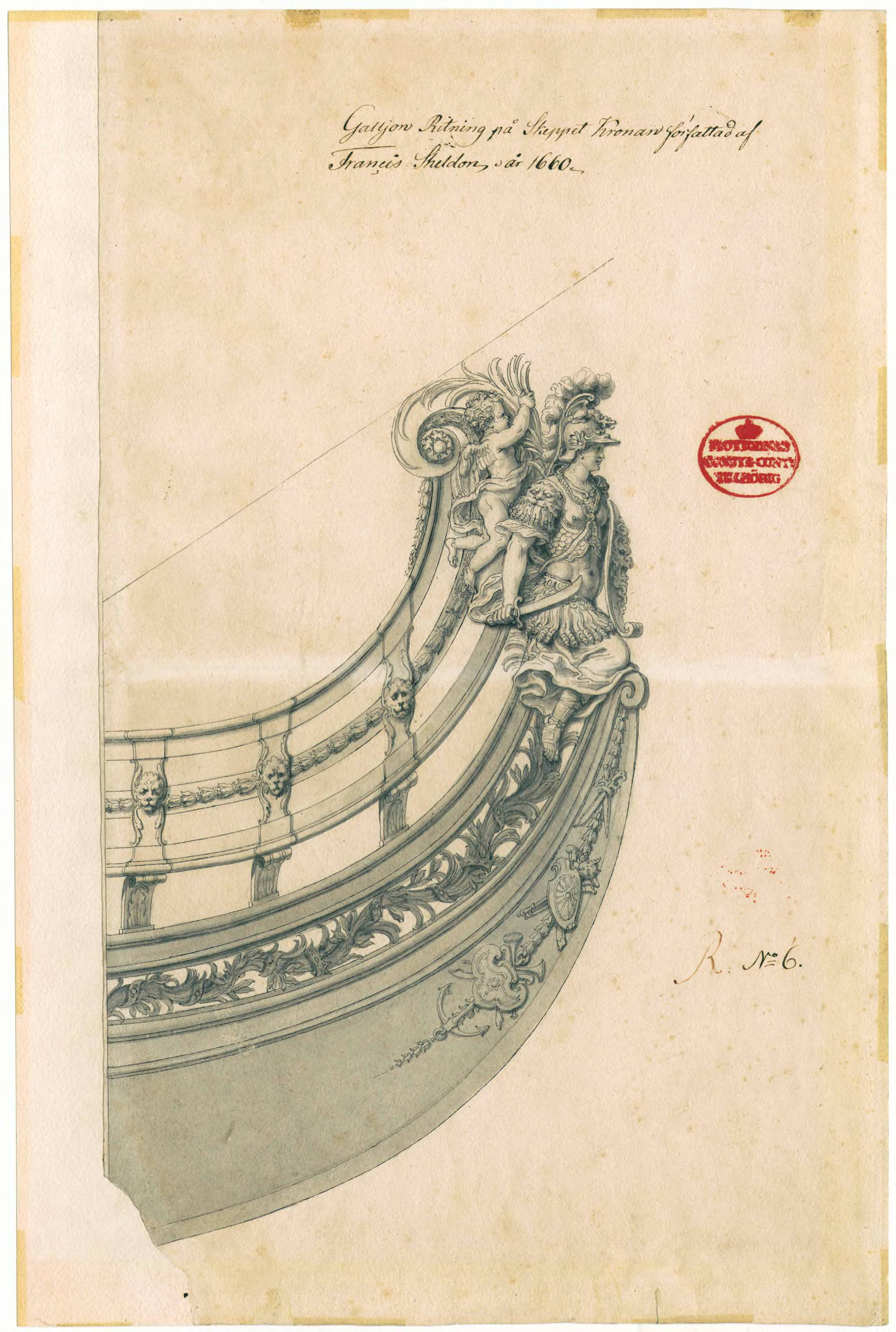
Bow of Kronan, drawing by Francis Sheldon (1660)

Archaeologists have not been able to recover enough of Kronan's sculptures for a detailed reconstruction of the ornamentation. The mascarons (architectural facemasks) and putti (images of children) that were salvaged as of 2007 show considerable artistic quality according to Soop. A large sculpture of a warrior figure was found in 1987 and is an example of high-quality workmanship, possibly even a symbolic portrait of King Charles. Since nothing is known of the surrounding ornamentation and sculptures, the conclusion remains speculative.

== Construction ==
In the early 1660s, a building program was initiated to expand the fleet and replace old capital ships. A new flagship was needed to replace the old Kronan from 1632. The felling of vast quantities of timber that were required for the new admiral's ship had already begun in the winter of 1664–65. Swedish historian Kurt Lundgren has estimated that 7–10 hectares (17–25 acres) of hundred-year-old oak forest was required for the hull and several tall, stout pines for the masts and bowsprit.

The construction of Kronan began in October 1665, and the hull was launched on 31 July 1668. The shipwright of the Kronan, Francis Sheldon, frequently came in conflict with the admiralty over the project. The navy administrators complained that he was unduly delaying the project and was spending too much time on his own private business ventures. The most aggravating contention was Sheldon spending time on exporting lucrative mast timber back home to England. Sheldon in turn complained about constant delays on the navy's part and lack of necessary funds to complete the project. When the ship was launched, the slipway turned out to be too small and the rear section of the keel broke off during the launching. The admiralty demanded an explanation, but Sheldon's reply was that the damage was easily mended and that the problem was that the timber had been left to dry too long. The conflict between the Admiralty and Sheldon dragged on for several years and caused constant delays. The sculptures were finished in 1669, but the rigging, tackling, and arming was drawn out a further three years, to 1672. The first occasion that the ship sailed was during the celebrations of Charles XI's accession as monarch in December 1672.

== Crew ==
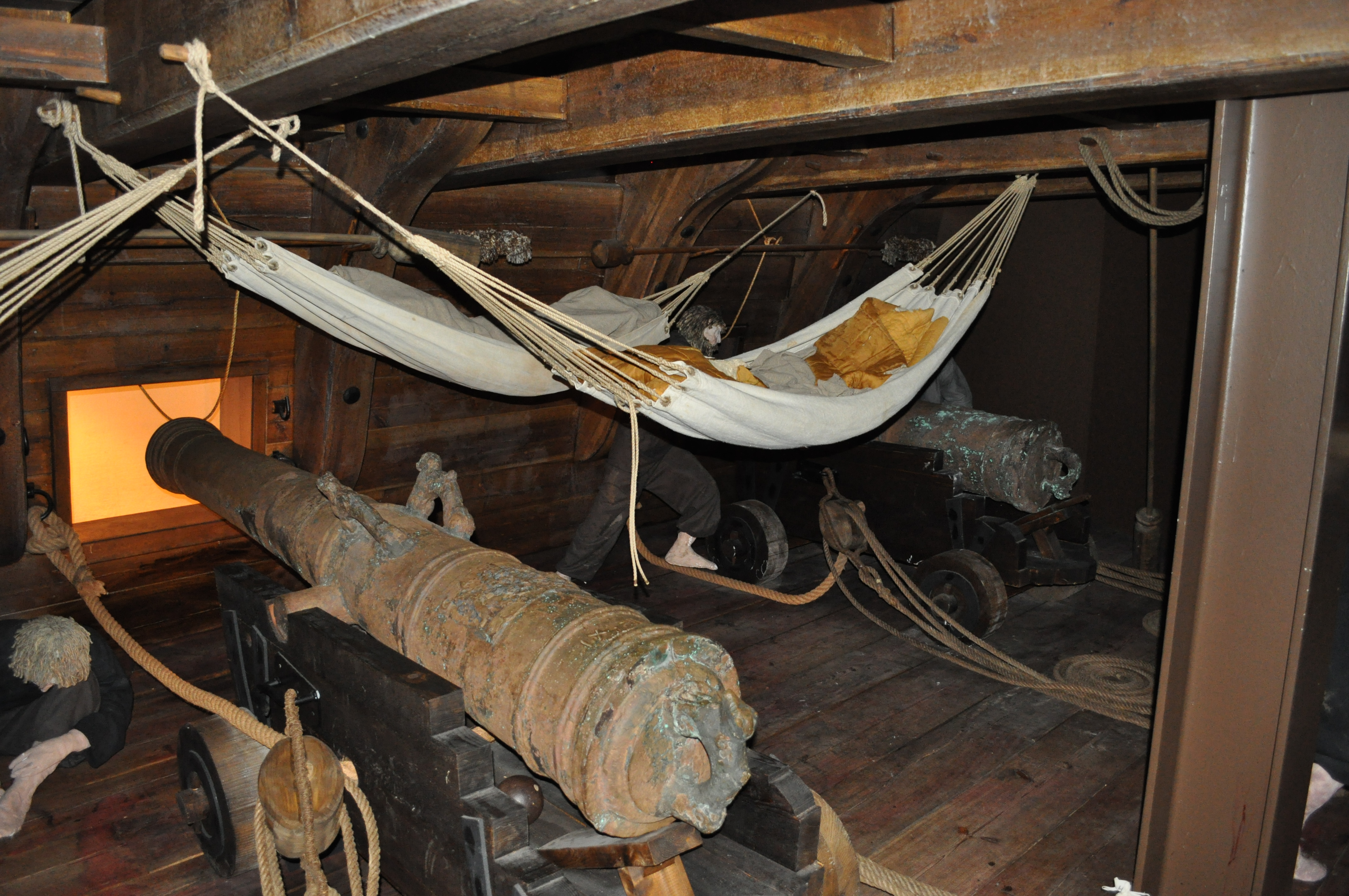
A full-scale mockup of a section of one of the gundecks of Kronan as part of the exhibition at Kalmar County Museum

As one of the largest ships of her time, Kronan had a sizable crew. When she sank there were 850 people on board – 500 sailors and 350 soldiers. Historians working with the excavation of the wreck site have compared the ship with a middle-sized Swedish town of the late 17th century, describing it as a "miniature society". On board were male representatives of both lower and upper classes. (Women were allowed on navy vessels only within the limits of Stockholm archipelago; before reaching the open sea, they had to disembark.) As a community afloat, Kronan mirrored the contemporary social standards of military and civilian life, two spheres that were not strictly separated in the 17th century.

The entire crew dressed in civilian clothing and there were no common navy uniforms. The Swedish army had only recently introduced standardized uniforms, something that was still uncommon in most of Europe. Clothing was differentiated according to social standing, with officers from the nobility dressed in elegant and expensive clothing while the ordinary crew dressed like laborers. The only exceptions were the soldiers of the Västerbotten infantry regiment who had by the 1670s been equipped with the first "Carolingian" uniforms in blue and white. The crew was sometimes assigned clothing or cloth with which to prepare "sailor garb" (båtmansklädning), which set them apart from the usual dress of the general populace. Officers maintained a large collection of fine clothing for use on board, but it is not known if it was used during everyday work. Quite likely they owned a set of clothes made from simpler, more durable and more comfortable fabrics which were more practical at sea.

Recruitment was done by forced musters as part of the earlier form of the so-called allotment system. Sailors and gunners were supplied by a båtsmanshåll (literally "sailor household"), small administrative units in coastal regions that were assigned the task of supplying the fleet with one adult male for navy service. The soldiers on board were recruited from the army equivalents, knekthåll or rotehåll, ("soldier" or "ward household") from inland areas. Officers originated mainly from the nobility or from the upper middle class, and were paid through the allotment system or the income from estates designated for the purpose. Higher-ranking officers most likely brought their personal servants on board. A valuable red jacket in bright red cloth that was worn by one of those who drowned on the ship could have belonged to one of these retinues.

== Military career ==
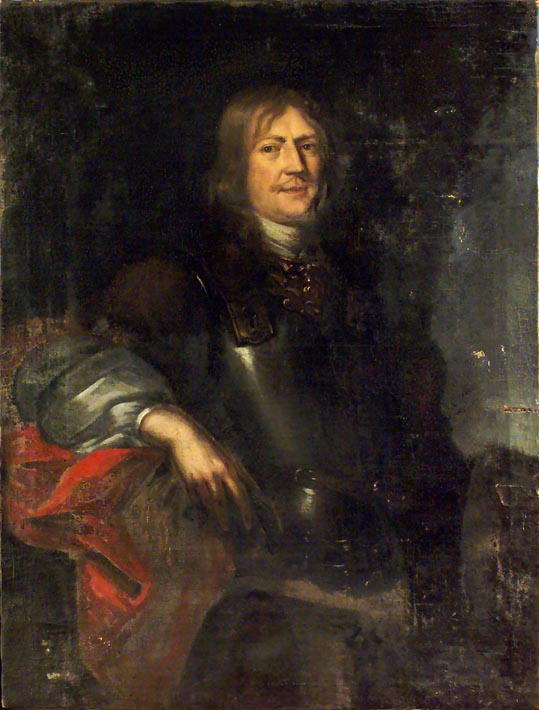
Portrait of Admiral of the Realm Gustaf Otto Stenbock, who was held personally responsible by Charles XI for the failure to support the reinforcements to Swedish Pomerania

=== Expedition of 1675 ===
After the Swedish loss at the battle of Fehrbellin in June 1675, the fleet was to support troop transports to reinforce Swedish Pomerania. It had potential for success as it was equipped with several large, well-armed ships: Svärdet ("the sword") of 1,800 tonnes, Äpplet ("the apple", a Swedish word also referring to the orb) and Nyckeln ("the key"), both 1,400 tonnes, and the enormous Kronan ("the crown"). Altogether there were 28 large and medium warships and almost the same number of smaller vessels. The supply organization was lacking. There were few experienced high-ranking officers and internal cooperation was poor; Danish contemporaries scornfully described the Swedish Navy crews as mere "farmhands dipped in saltwater".

With Kronan as its flagship, the fleet went to sea in October 1675 under Admiral of the Realm (riksamiral) Gustaf Otto Stenbock, but got no farther than Stora Karlsö off Gotland. The weather was unusually cold and stormy and the ships could not be heated. The crew were poorly clothed and soon many of them fell ill. Supplies dwindled, and after Kronan lost a bow anchor after less than two weeks at sea, Stenbock decided to turn back to the Dalarö anchorage south-east of Stockholm. Nothing came of the reinforcements of the North German provinces. King Charles reacted with anger and held Stenbock personally responsible for the failed expedition, forcing him to pay more than 100,000 dalers out of his own pocket. King Charles later rehabilitated Stenbock by giving him an army appointment in Norway, but in early 1676 he replaced him with Lorentz Creutz, a prominent treasury official. Naval historian Jan Glete has explained this as a step that was "necessary in a time of crisis" due to Creutz's administrative skills and treasury connections, but Creutz had no experience as a naval commander, something that would later prove crucial.

=== Failed winter expedition ===
As the situation for the Swedish army in Pomerania deteriorated during the winter of 1675–76, the fleet, with Kronan as flagship, was ordered to sea again in a desperate attempt to relieve the hard-pressed Swedish land forces. The weather was unusually cold and large parts of the Baltic were iced in. The fleet, now under the command of the seasoned sea officer Claes Uggla, was blocked by ice when it reached Dalarö on 23 January. The Privy Councilor Erik Lindschöld had been assigned by the King to assist with the expedition, and he came up with the idea of cutting the fleet out of the ice to reach the open sea. Hundreds of local peasants were ordered out to open a narrow channel through the ice with saws and picks to the anchorage at Älvsnabben, more than 20 km (12 mi) away. On reaching the naval station on 14 February, three weeks later, it turned out that most of the sea outside the inner skerries was frozen as well. A storm hit the tightly packed ships and the ensuing movement of the ice crushed the hull of the supply vessel Leoparden, sinking it. A Danish force had managed to reach the open waters farther off and observed the immobilized Swedish ships from a distance. When temperatures fell even further, the project was declared hopeless and Lindschöld gave up the attempt.

=== 1676 ===
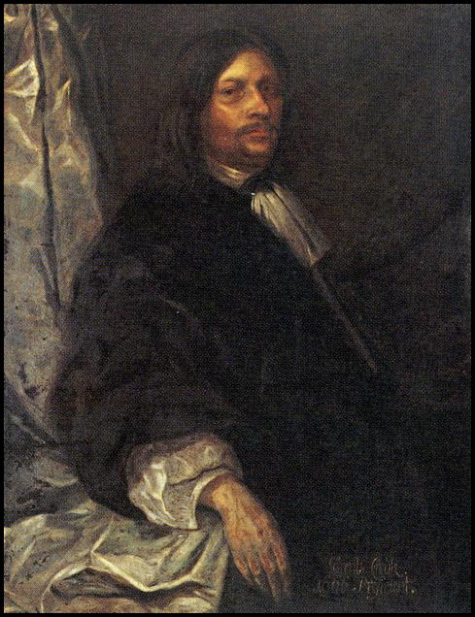
Contemporary painting of Lorentz Creutz (1615–76)

Early in March 1676, a Danish fleet of 20 ships under Admiral Niels Juel left Copenhagen. On 29 April it landed troops on Gotland, which soon surrendered. The Swedish fleet was ordered out on 4 May, but experienced adverse winds and was delayed until 19 May. Juel had by then already left Visby, the principal port of Gotland with a garrison force. He headed for Bornholm to join with a small Danish–Dutch squadron in cruising between Scania and the island of Rügen to prevent any Swedish seaborne reinforcement from reaching Pomerania. On 25–26 May the two fleets met each other in the battle of Bornholm. Despite the considerable Swedish advantage in ships, men and guns, they were unable to inflict any losses on the allied force, and lost a fireship and two minor vessels. The battle revealed the lack of coherence and organization within the Swedish ranks, which soured relations between Creutz and his officers.

After the failed action, the Swedish fleet anchored off Trelleborg where King Charles was waiting with new orders to recapture Gotland. The fleet was to avoid combat with the allies at least until they reached the northern tip of Öland, where they could fight in friendly waters. When the Swedish fleet left Trelleborg on 30 May they were soon intercepted by the allied fleet, which then began a pursuit. By this time the allies had been reinforced by another small squadron and totaled 42 vessels, with 25 large and medium ships of the line. The reinforcements brought with them a new commander, the Dutch Admiral General Cornelis Tromp, one of the most renowned naval tacticians of his time. The two fleets sailed north and on 1 June passed the southern tip of Öland in a strong gale. The Swedish ships fared poorly in the rough winds, losing masts and spars. The Swedish officers formed a battle line that held together only with great difficulty. They tried to get ahead of Tromp's ships to gain the weather gage by getting between the allies and the shore, and thereby gaining an advantageous tactical position. The Dutch ships of the allied fleet managed to sail close-hauled faster than the rest of the force and slipped between the Swedes and the coast, taking up the crucial weather gage. Later that morning the two fleets closed in on each other and were soon within firing range.

=== Sinking ===
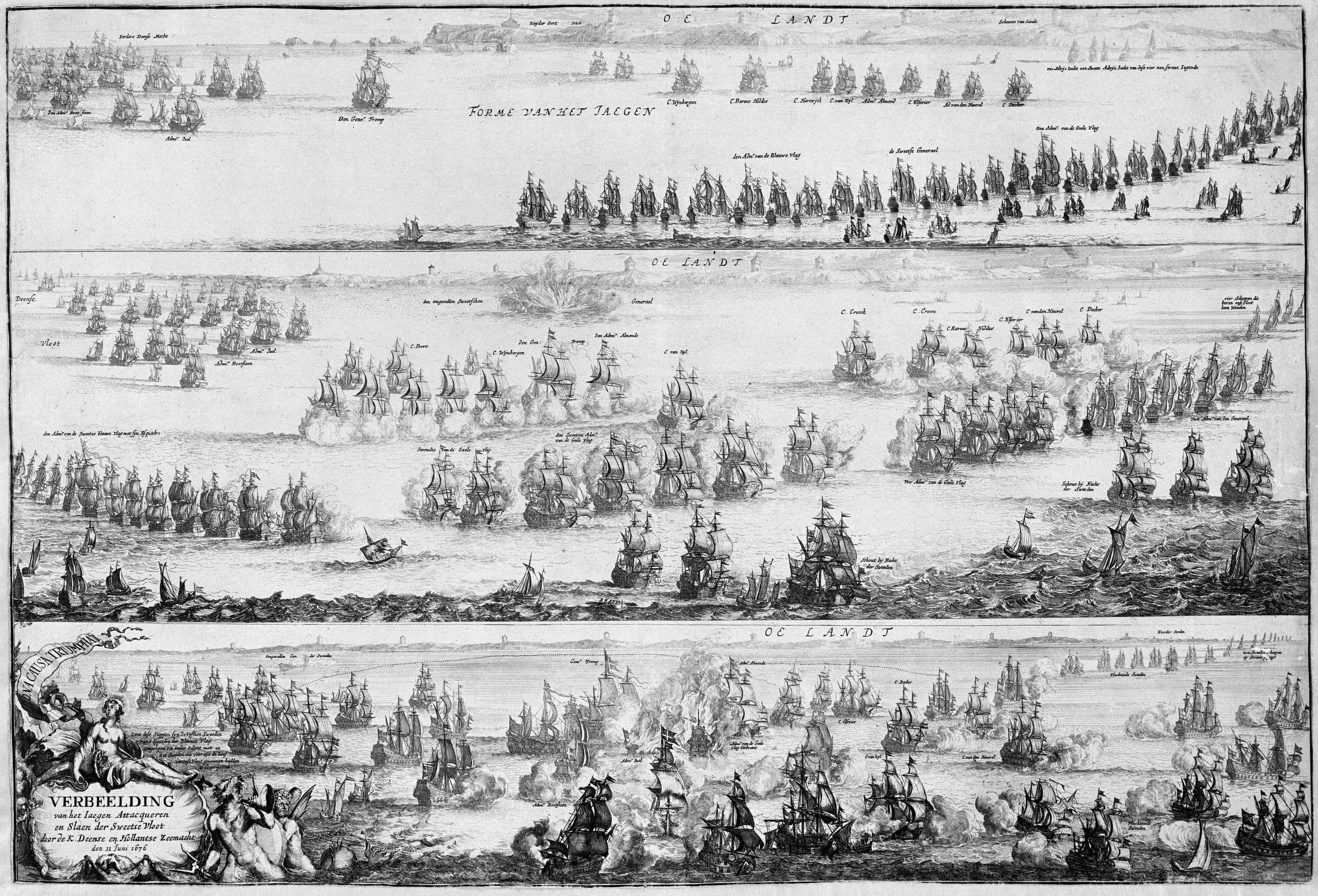
A contemporary depiction that divides the battle into three phases: (1) the two fleets sailing northwards along the coast of Öland, just passing the southern tip of Öland, (2) Kronan exploding and Svärdet surrounded, and (3) the Swedish fleet fleeing in disorder, pursued by allied ships. Copper engraving by Romeyn de Hooghe, 1676.

Around noon, some distance northeast of Hulterstad, the Swedish fleet made what the military historian Ingvar Sjöblom has described as "a widely debated maneuver". Because of misunderstandings and poorly coordinated signaling, the Swedish fleet attempted to turn and engage the allied fleet before they had sailed past the northern end of Öland, which had been agreed on before the battle. Sharp turns in rough weather were known to be perilous, especially for ships that had stability weaknesses. Kronan turned to port (left), but with too much sail, and heeled so far over that she began to flood through the open gunports. The crew was unable to correct the imbalance and the ship laid over completely with the masts parallel with the water. Soon after, the gunpowder store in the forward part of the Kronan ignited for unknown reasons and exploded, ripping apart a large section of the starboard side forward of the mainmast. The remaining section rose with the stern pointing up in the air and the broken-off forward part toward the bottom. She then rapidly sank with the port side down. When the wreck hit the seabed, the hull suffered a major fracture along its side, further damaging the structure.

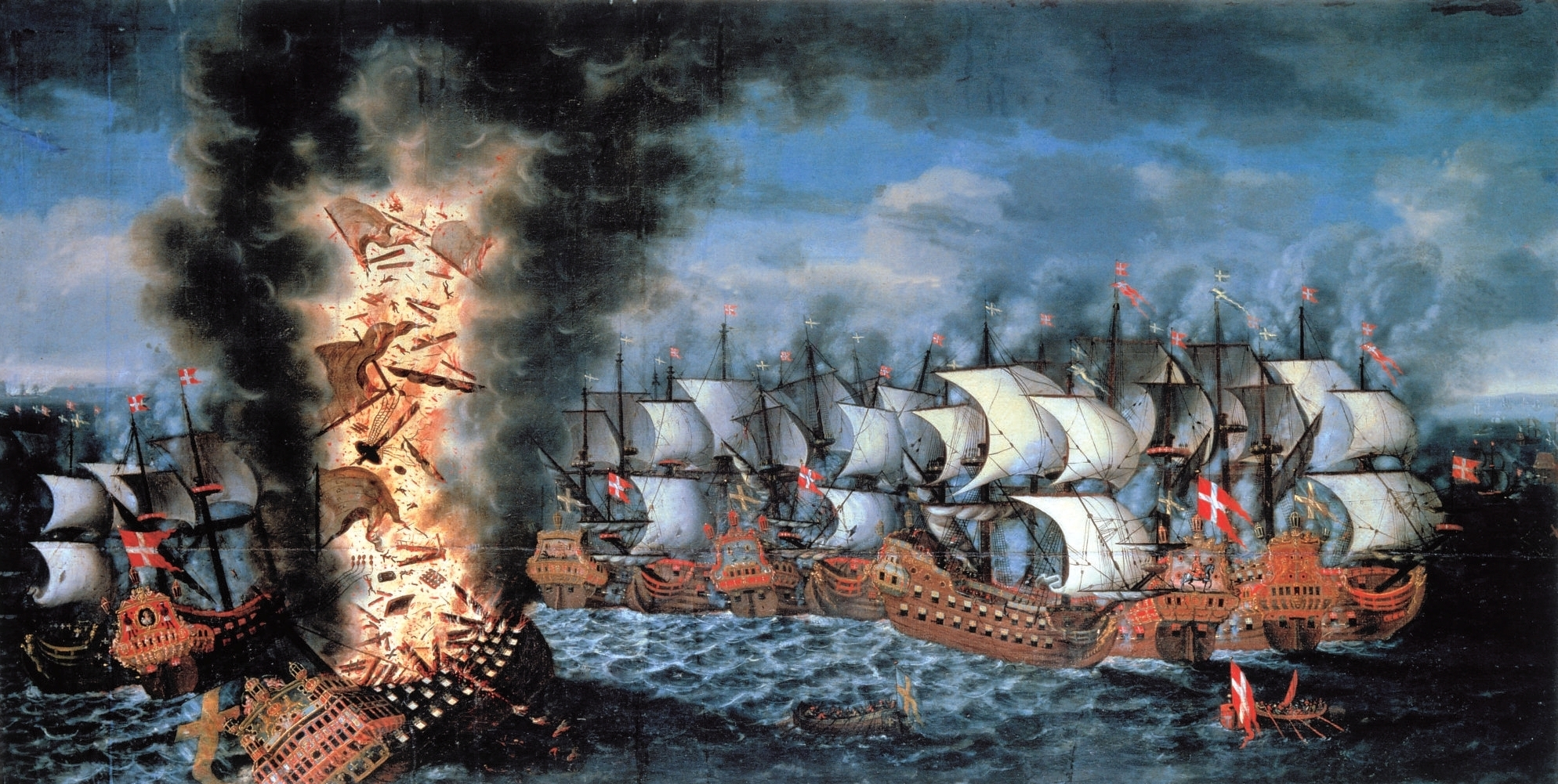
A painting by a Danish artist from 1686, showing how Kronan explodes while foundering. On the right Svärdet is engaged on both sides by the allied generals. In reality, the two events were separated in time and space.

During this rapid sinking, a large proportion of the crew suffered severe trauma, as is shown by osteological analyses of the skeletal remains. Many of the remains had deep, unhealed lacerations on skulls, vertebrae, ribs and other limbs. There are two primary theories about the cause of the injuries. Osteologist Ebba Düring has suggested that discipline and social cohesion collapsed during the sinking. The crew would have resorted to "all the means at their disposal, both physical as well as psychological" to escape the ship, an interpretation that is echoed by historian Ingvar Sjöblom. Medical historian Katarina Villner, on the other hand, has proposed that the injuries were caused by the sudden and violent chaos of the sinking itself, which would have thrown men, heavy equipment and cannons around.

The loss of the Admiral's flagship threw the Swedish forces into disorder, and soon Svärdet, next in line as fleet flagship, was surrounded by the allied admirals and set ablaze by a Dutch fireship after an extended artillery duel. Only 50 of the 650-strong crew escaped the gun battle and the inferno, and among the dead was the acting Admiral Claes Uggla. After losing two of its highest ranking commanders as well as its two largest ships, the Swedish fleet fled in disarray. Solen later ran aground; Järnvågen, Neptunus and three smaller vessels were captured. Äpplet later sank after breaking her moorings off Dalarö.

=== Aftermath ===
According to the artillery officer Anders Gyllenspak, only 40 men, including himself, survived the sinking: Major Johan Klerk, 2 trumpeters, 14 sailors and 22 soldiers, which means that more than 800 had perished. Among them were half a dozen navy and army officers as well as the chief physician of the Admiralty and the fleet apothecary. Altogether around 1,400 men died when Kronan and Svärdet were lost, and in the days following the battle, hundreds of corpses were washed up on the east coast of Öland. According to the vicar of Långlöt parish, 183 men were taken from the beaches and buried at Hulterstad and Stenåsa graveyards. Lorentz Creutz's body was identified and shipped to his estate Sarvlax near the town of Loviisa, Finland, where it was buried. The losses were even worse since Kronan was the flagship and was manned with the best sailors and gunners in the fleet. When Kronan and Svärdet went down, they took with them the navy's entire stock of 30- and 36-pounder guns. Altogether over 300 tonnes of bronze guns worth nearly 250,000 silver dalers went down with the ships, a sum that was slightly higher than the value of the ships themselves.

Within a week, the news of the failure at Bornholm and the disaster at Öland reached King Charles, who immediately ordered that a commission be set up to investigate the fiasco. Charles wanted to know if Bär and other officers were guilty of cowardice or incompetence. On 13 June the King wrote that "some of our sea officers have shown such cowardly and careless behavior [that they] have placed the safety, welfare and defense of the kingdom at great peril", and that "such a great crime should be sternly punished". The commission began its work on 7 June 1676 and finished in October 1677, without passing any sentences. Admiral Johan Bär of Nyckeln and Lieutenant Admiral Christer Boije, who ran aground with Äpplet, were never again given a navy command. One of the accused, Hans Clerck of Solen, was promoted to full admiral by the King even before the commission presented its findings.

== Causes of sinking ==
Inappropriate handling in rough weather was the most obvious cause for Kronan's sinking. Unlike Vasa, Kronan's sailing characteristics were not inherently flawed and the ship had served for several years in rough seas. During the work of the commission, artillery officer Anders Gyllenspak even made direct comparisons to Vasa. He testified that Kronan's ballast had been lightened at Dalarö at the beginning of the campaign and that she had not replenished her supply of drink, so that the ship had a shallower draft and would have been somewhat less stable than with full stores, though he did not blame this on Creutz.

Why the Swedish fleet deviated from the original plan of engaging the allied force in home waters north of Öland has never been satisfactorily explained. According to Rosenberg and Gyllenspak on Kronan, Creutz made a turn because Uggla had signaled that he was going about. Rosenberg also believed that Bär on Nyckeln, admiral of the first squadron, was first to make a turn, and that Uggla considered it necessary to follow this unplanned maneuver to keep the fleet together. Officers Anders Homman and Olof Norman, who both survived Svärdet, claimed that only Creutz as fleet commander could have made such a decision and that Uggla was only following Kronan's lead. Witnesses who testified before the commission claimed that conflict between the officers was the reason that necessary precautions were not taken before Kronan came about. Rosenberg testified that Lieutenant Admiral Arvid Björnram and Major Klas Ankarfjäll had openly disagreed on how much sail should be set and how close to land the ship should sail. According to Gyllenspak, senior fleet pilot Per Gabrielsson had voiced his concerns against turning in the rough weather, but no one had heeded his advice.

Several scholars and authors have blamed Creutz for the loss of his ship, and he has been criticized as an incompetent sailor and officer who through lack of naval experience brought about the sinking. Historian Gunnar Grandin has suggested that the intent of the maneuver was to take advantage of the scattered allied fleet, but that many of the officers on Kronan opposed the idea; Creutz and Björnram urged that the ship turn quickly to gain a tactical advantage while Ankarfjäll and Gabrielsson were concerned about the immediate safety of the ship. Grandin has also suggested that Creutz may have suffered a mental breakdown after the failure at Bornholm and the open dispute with his officers, which led to a rash and ultimately fatal decision.

More recent views present the question of responsibility as more nuanced and complex – suggesting that Creutz cannot be singled out as solely responsible for the disaster. Historians Ingvar Sjöblom and Lars Ericson Wolke have pointed out that Creutz's position as admiral was comparable to that of a chief minister. He would have primarily been an administrator without the need for intimate knowledge of practical details; turning a ship in rough weather would have been the responsibility of his subordinates. Sjöblom has stressed that the disagreement between Major Ankarfjäll and Lieutenant Admiral Björnram on how much sail was needed wasted precious time in a situation where quick decisions were crucial. Creutz was also unique as a supreme commander of the navy since he had no experience of military matters. The Swedish naval officer corps in the late 17th century lacked the prestige of army commanders, and seasoned officers and even admirals could be outranked by inexperienced civilians or army commanders with little or no naval background. Maritime archaeologist Lars Einarsson has suggested that Creutz's "choleric and willful temperament" probably played a part, but that it could equally be blamed on an untrained and inexperienced crew and the open discord among the officers. According to Sjöblom it is still unclear to historians whether there was a designated ship commander on Kronan with overall responsibility.

== History as a shipwreck ==
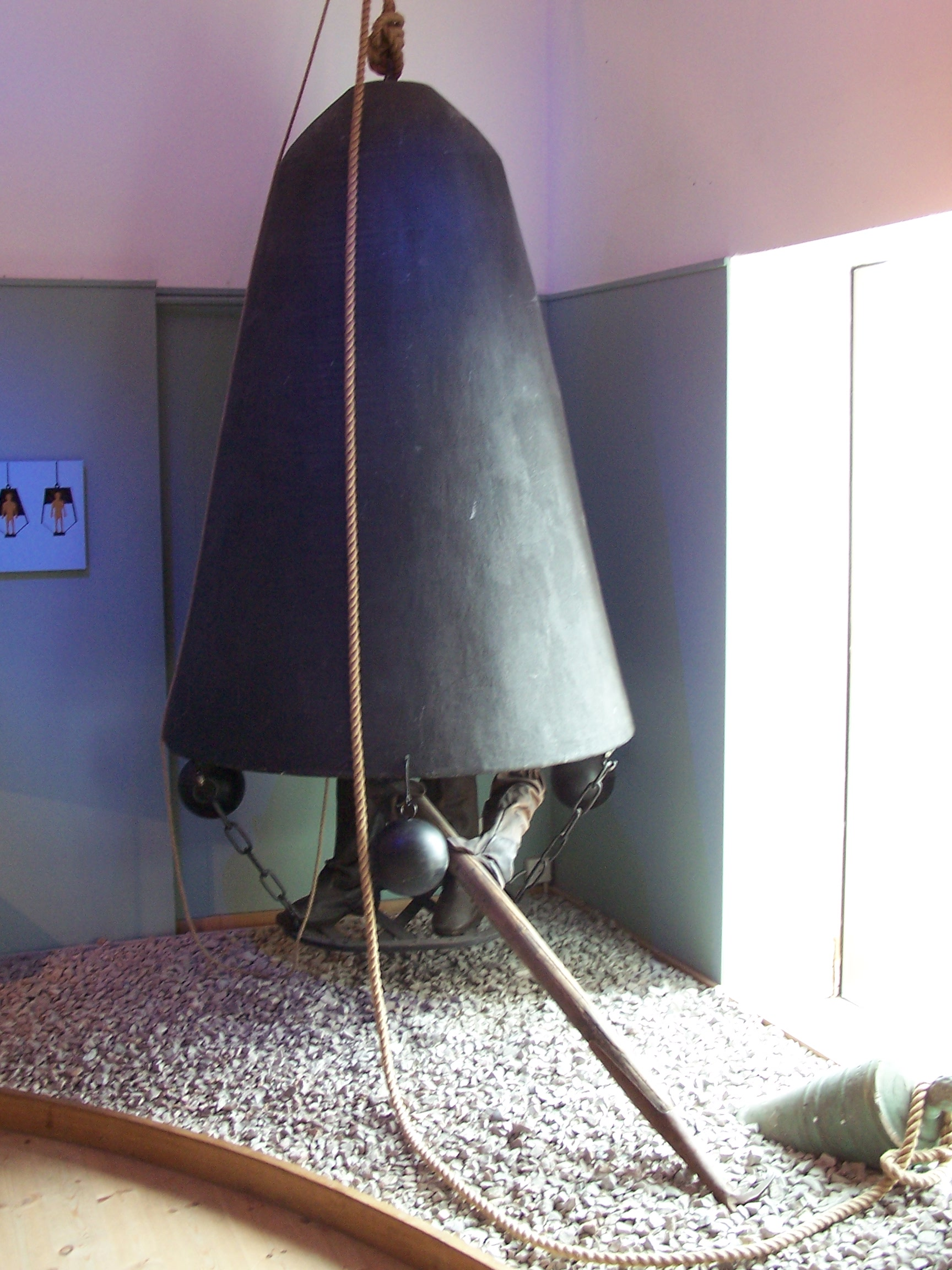
A reconstruction of a diving bell of the type used for salvaging cannons from Vasa and Kronan in the late 17th century at an exhibition in the Marinmuseum, Karlskrona

The total cost of Kronan was estimated at 326,000 silver dalers in contemporary currency, and about half of the cost, 166,000 dalers, lay in the armaments. It was therefore in the interest of the Swedish Navy to salvage as many of the cannons as possible. In the early 1660s almost all the guns from Vasa had been brought up through greatly improved technology. Commander Paul Rumpf and Admiral Hans Wachtmeister were put in charge of the salvage of Kronan's cannons. With the help of diving bells, they were able to raise 60 cannons worth 67,000 daler in the summers (c. June–August) of 1679–86, beginning as soon as the war with Denmark had ended. In the 1960s, diving expert Bo Cassel made some successful descents to Vasa with a diving bell made according to 17th-century specifications. In 1986, further experiments were done on Kronan. The tests proved successful and the conclusion was that the 17th-century operations must have required considerable experience, skill and favorable weather conditions. Though the conditions off Öland were often difficult, with cold water and unpredictable weather, and required a large crew, the expeditions were very profitable. Historian Björn Axel Johansson has calculated that the total cost for the entire crew for all eight diving seasons was less than 2,000 dalers, the value of one of Kronan's 36-pounder guns.

=== Rediscovery ===
The marine engineer and amateur historian Anders Franzén had searched for old Swedish wrecks in the Baltic since the 1940s and became nationally renowned after he located Vasa in 1956. Kronan was one of several famous shipwrecks on a list of potential wreck sites that he had compiled. For almost 30 years Franzén and others scoured archives and probed the seabed off the east coast of Öland. During the 1950s and 1960s the team searched off Hulterstad by dragging, and later followed up with sonar scans. In 1971 planks believed to belong to Kronan were located, but the lead could not be followed up properly at the time. Later in the 1970s the search area was narrowed down with a sidescan sonar and a magnetometer, an instrument that detects the presence of iron. With the two instruments the team pinned down a likely location, and in early August 1980, sent down underwater cameras to reveal the first pictures of Kronan.

== Archaeology ==
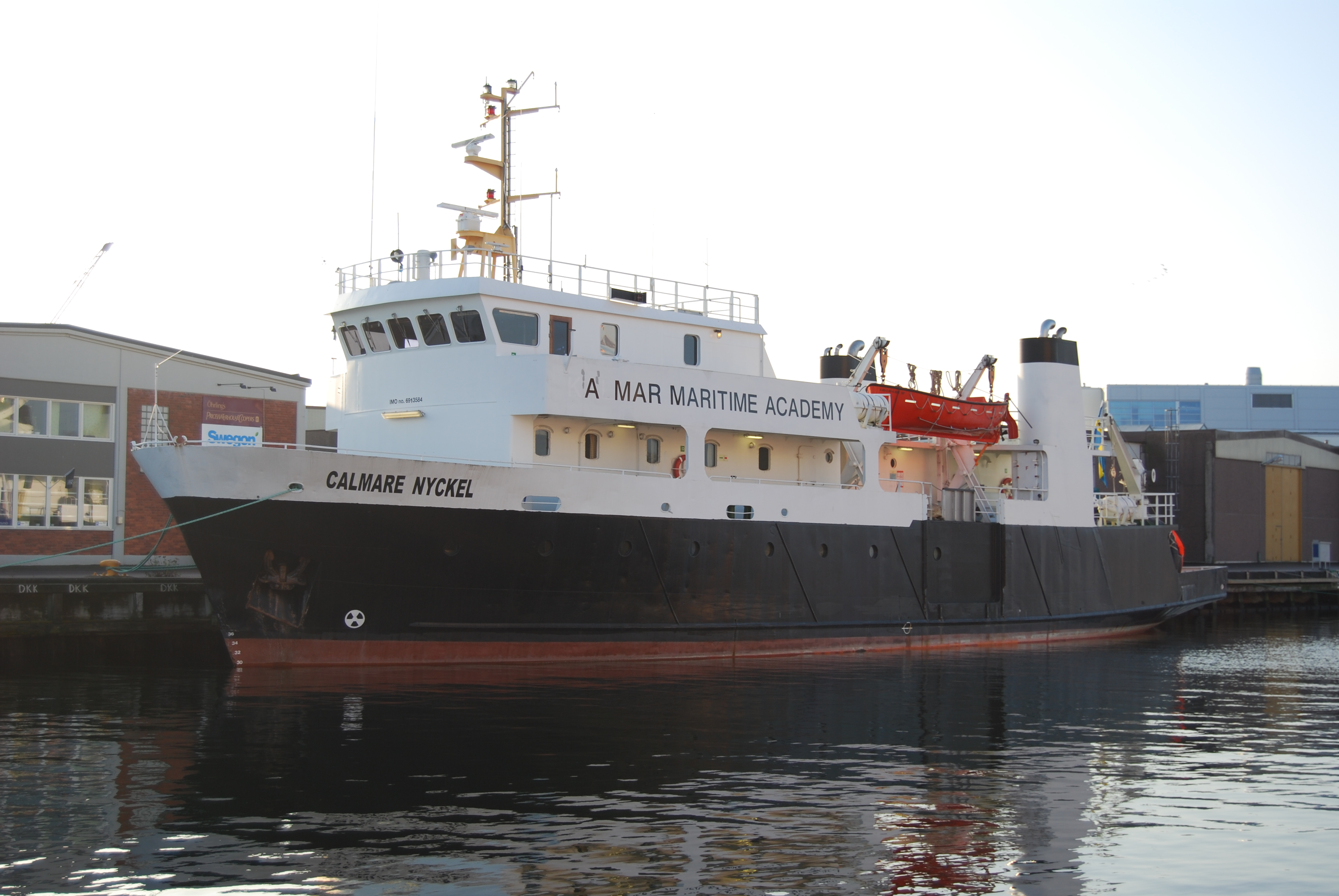
MS Calmare Nyckel has been used as a diving platform for the excavations of Kronan since 1991, and is one of several vessels that have been used so far.

The remains of Kronan lie at a depth of 26 m (85 ft), 6 km (3.7 mi) east of Hulterstad, off the east coast of Öland. Since her rediscovery in 1980, there have been annual diving expeditions to the site of the wreck from June to August. By Baltic Sea standards, the conditions are good for underwater archaeological work; the wreck site is far from land, away from the regular shipping lanes, and has not been affected by pollution from the land or excessive growth of marine vegetation. The visibility, especially in early summer, is good and can be up to 20 m. The seabed consists of mostly infertile sand that reflects much of the sunlight from the surface, aiding the surveying and documentation of the site with underwater cameras. Around 85% of the wreck site has been charted so far and Kronan has become one of the most extensive and well-publicized maritime archaeological projects in the Baltic Sea.

=== Finds ===
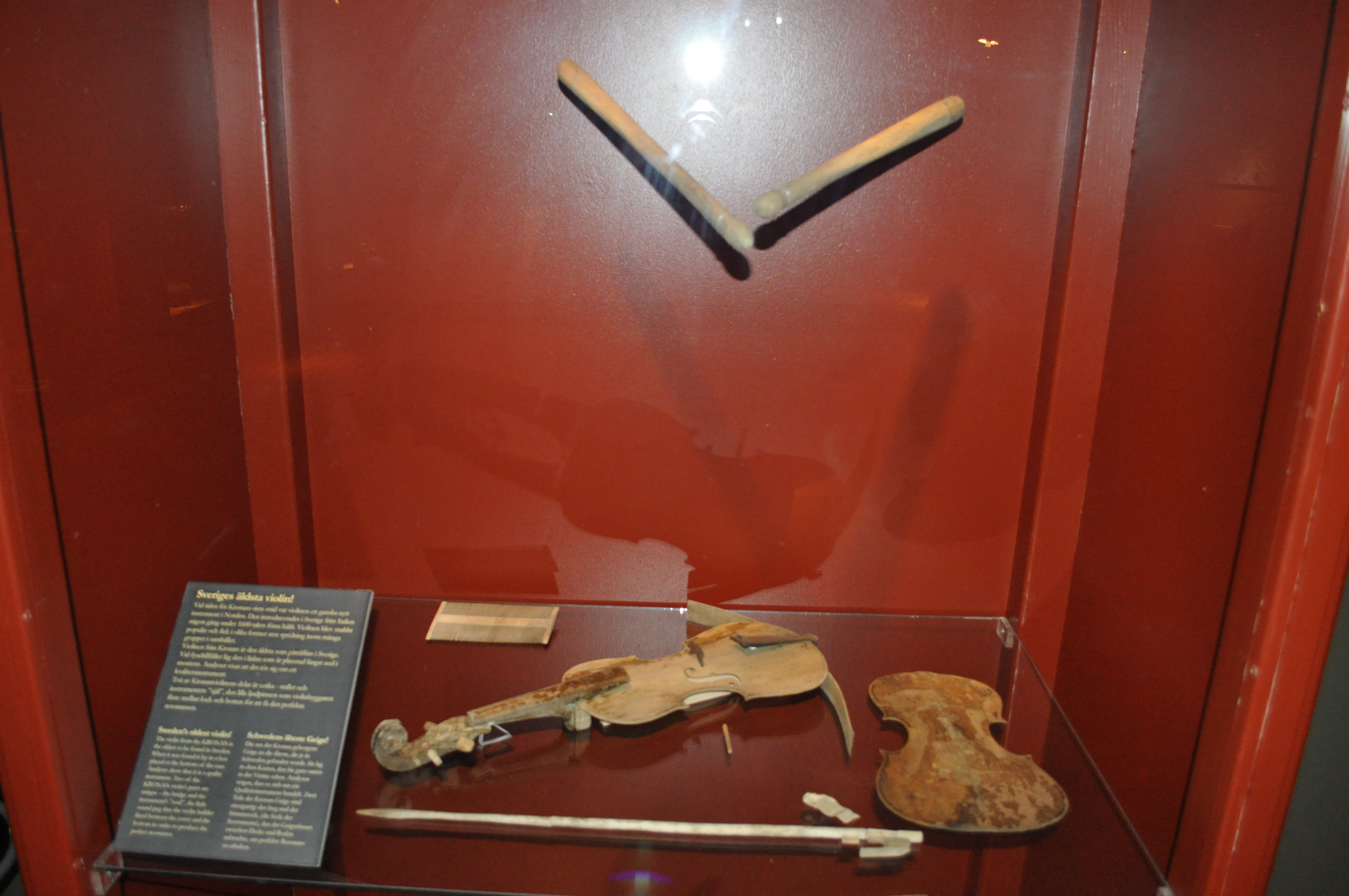
The remains of one of the violins and two drumsticks on display at Kalmar County Museum

More than 30,000 artifacts from Kronan have been salvaged and cataloged, ranging from bronze cannons of up to four tonnes to small eggshell fragments. There have been several discoveries of considerable importance, and some of unique historical and archaeological value. One of the first finds was a small table cabinet with nine drawers containing navigational instruments, pipe-cleaning tools, cutlery and writing utensils, which most likely belonged to one of the officers. As a flagship, Kronan carried a large amount of cash in the form of silver coins. Besides wages for the crew, a war chest was required for large, unforeseen expenses. In 1982, a collection of 255 gold coins was found, most of them ducats. The origin of the individual coins varied considerably, with locations such as Cairo, Reval (modern-day Tallinn), and Seville. Another 46 ducats were found in 2000. The coin collection is probably the largest gold treasure ever encountered on Swedish soil, though it was not enough to cover large expenses, which has led to the assumption that they were the personal property of Admiral Lorentz Creutz. In 1989, more than 900 silver coins were found in the remains of the orlop, at the time the largest silver coin collection ever discovered in Sweden. In 2005, a much larger cache of nearly 6,200 coins was uncovered and in 2006 yet another with more than 7,000 coins. The silver treasure of 2005 consisted almost entirely of 4 öre-coins minted in 1675, which represented over 1% of the entire production of 4 öre-coins of that year.

Several musical instruments have been found, including a trumpet, three violins and a viola da gamba, all expensive objects that probably belonged to either the officers or the trumpeters. One of the trumpeters on board was a member of the admiral's musical ensemble and it is assumed that one of the particularly fine, German-made instruments belonged to him. Another remnant of the officers' personal stores was discovered in 1997, consisting of a woven basket filled with tobacco and expensive imported foodstuffs and spices, including ginger, plums, grapes and cinnamon quills.

Approximately seven percent of the finds consist of textiles. Much of the clothing, particularly that of the officers and their personal servants, is well preserved and has provided information on clothing manufacture during the late 17th century, something that has otherwise been difficult to research based only on depictions.

== See also ==
- Mary Rose, an English 16th-century carrack that was salvaged in 1982
- La Belle, a French merchant ship wrecked in 1686 and salvaged in 1997
- Vasa, a Swedish warship which foundered and sank in 1628, was rediscovered in 1956, and was subsequently recovered
- Mars, a Swedish warship which sank in 1564, and was rediscovered in 2011
