= Battle of Bornholm (1676) =

1676 naval battle

- Part of the Scanian War
Date	25–26 May 1676
Location	Between the islands of Bornholm and Rügen
Result	Disputed (see Aftermath)

Belligerents
Denmark–Norway; Dutch Republic	(yes) Swedish Empire

Commanders and leaders
(Denmark–Norway) Niels Juel (Denmark–Norway) Jens Rodsten (Dutch Republic) Philip van Almonde	(Swedish Empire) Lorentz Creutz (Swedish Empire) Claes Uggla (Swedish Empire) Johan Bär

Strength
25 ships of the line 10 frigates	17 large, 13 medium-sized ships of the line 21 smaller vessels and armed merchants 8 fireships

Casualties and losses
55 killed, 15 wounded	1 storeship (Konung David) captured and burned, 1 fireship (Leopard) captured Unknown number of dead and wounded

The battle of Bornholm was a naval battle between a superior Swedish and a smaller Danish-Dutch fleet that was fought 25–26 May 1676 as a part of the Scanian War. The objective for both sides was naval supremacy in the southern Baltic Sea. The Swedish commander Lorentz Creutz sought to destroy the allied fleet and then land reinforcements in Swedish Pomerania to relieve the Swedish forces in northern Germany. The aim of the Danishfleet under Niels Juel was to prevent this reinforcement without being destroyed by the superior numbers of the Swedish forces.

The Danish navy managed to put to sea by March and conquered the Swedish island of Gotland before the Swedish fleet even managed to get out of its base in Stockholm. The two fleets sighted each other on the morning of 25 May and by night came within firing range of one another, near the Jasmund Peninsula off the northeast corner of Rügen. Darkness put an end to the battle after both forces had turned north. Fighting was resumed on the morning of the 26th and went on with both fleets formed in lines of battle, without any attempts at forcing boarding actions. In the afternoon Juel broke off for Øresund (the strait between Sweden and Denmark), where the allied fleet anchored in the shoals of Falsterborev (Falsterbo reef), off the Scanian coast. Creutz did not dare pursue and anchored off Trelleborg to receive instructions from Swedish King Charles XI.

The Swedish force lost three small vessels, an insignificant loss tactically, but the allied fleet still won a strategic victory. Juel's force, though somewhat battered, was nevertheless intact and was reinforced two days later with an additional nine ships along with the experienced Dutch admiral Cornelis Tromp, who took over the command. The inability to force a decisive action against the allied fleet sparked a row between Creutz and his officers, severely crippling Swedish discipline and cohesion. Only a few days after the battle of Bornholm, on 1 June, the Swedish fleet suffered a serious defeat at the battle of Öland and lost control of the Baltic for the rest of the year.

== Background ==
In the summer of 1675, Sweden had attacked Brandenburg at the request of its ally, France, at the time the dominant great power in Europe. This sparked a declaration of war by the Dutch Republic which was at war with France since 1672 in the Franco-Dutch War. After a minor defeat against Brandenburg forces at the battle of Fehrbellin on 18 June 1675, several North German states and the Holy Roman Emperor joined the war against Sweden. Denmark saw in this an opportunity to regain the provinces of Scania, Blekinge and Halland, lost to Sweden under humiliating circumstances in 1660, and declared war on 2 September. The southern Baltic Sea now became a strategically vital area to both sides; Denmark needed the sea lanes to invade the Swedish mainland while Sweden needed them to reinforce their hard-pressed armies in Pomerania; both needed to secure their maritime trade routes.

During 1675 the Swedish fleet under Gustaf Otto Stenbock put to sea, but only got as far as Stora Karslö off Gotland before it had turn back to Stockholm beset by cold and stormy weather, disease and loss of vital equipment. Stenbock was held personally responsible for the failure by King Charles XI and was forced to reimburse the cost of the campaign out of his own pocket. The winter of 1675-76, the Swedish fleet was placed under the command of Lorentz Creutz, but was iced in by an exceptionally harsh winter.

== Prelude ==
Early in April 1676 a Danish fleet of 13 vessels set sail and was reinforced by an increasing number of ships, including the Swedish Caritas that was captured on 22 April. Danish forces landed on Gotland and quickly seized the important port of Klintehamn and the fortification of Visborg in Visby.

The Swedish fleet was ordered out on 4 May, but was held back by adverse wind conditions and was delayed until 19 May. Juel had by then already left Visby and sailed for Bornholm to combine with a smaller Danish-Dutch force. The Swedish fleet consisted of 17 large and 15 medium ships, 8 armed merchants, 11 minor vessels and 8 fireships divided into four squadrons: the first squadron was under the Admiral of the Realm Lorentz Creutz on Kronan with the other squadrons divided among his three admirals Claes Uggla on Svärdet, Johan Bär on Nyckeln and Johan Bergenstjerna on Victoria. Bergenstjerna, however, died after a brief illness on 20 May and the ships of his squadron were divided among the other commanders. According to official records, the fleet had close to 2,200 guns and about 11,400 men, 8,300 sailors and 3,100 soldiers.

Juel had moved his fleet between Scania and the island of Rügen to prevent the Swedish navy from landing troops on the North German coast. He had also been reinforced with Dutch and Danish ships along with the able commanders Philip van Almonde and Jens Rodsten. The two forces sighted each other on 24 May and came in contact the day after.

== Battle ==
Around six o'clock in the morning on 25 May, the two fleets were in sight of each other and Creutz, knowing that he had a numerically superior force, attacked. Juel first sailed towards the northwest in the direction of Öresund, but then turned south towards Jasmund, the north-eastern part of Rügen. The weather was calm throughout the day and the two fleets made little progress. At nightfall, the distance between them had closed and Juel decided to accept battle. The Swedish fleet had difficulties in keeping its formation, and during a maneuver the Danish line managed to cut the Swedish line of battle, capturing the fireship Didric while the fireship Leoparden was driven into a Brandenburg squadron heading for Copenhagen and taken.

Around midnight little had been achieved and the fleets disengaged, but stayed within sight of one another. Around 7 o'clock on 26 May the Swedish force attacked with Uggla's second squadron in the lead, the two fleet sailing side by side while exchanging gunfire. According to the master gunner on Kronan Anders Gyllenspak one of the allied admirals, the Dutch Philip van Allemonde, sailed too close in his flagship Delft and received "a few tough shots with bar shot" by the heavy artillery on Kronan "so that the beakhead went completely asunder, and then the entire ship's side, and finally the stern, so that one could drive a horse and carriage through it". The heavy damage forced Allemonde to move his flag to Gideon and disengage himself from the fighting.

Despite the superiority in numbers, the Swedish side was not able to take advantage of the situation to engage the allied ships at close range to board and capture them. Rather, the battle turned into a ranged artillery duel. When Juel disengaged around four o'clock in the afternoon, the only ships to pursue him were Kronan, Solen and Draken and Uggla's squadron, while the rest stayed behind. With less than half of his forces behind him, Creutz was unable to press the chase for the allied fleet, which was able to run into the reefs at Falsterborev off the Scanian coast. Even though the Swedish fleet was the more powerful force, it was unable to sink or disable any enemy ships and lost the bojort Kung David.

== Aftermath ==
After the unsuccessful action, the Swedish fleet anchored off Trelleborg where King Charles was waiting with new orders to recapture Gotland. The fleet was to refuse combat with the allies at least until they reached the northern tip of Öland, where they could fight in friendly waters. When the Swedish fleet left Trelleborg on 30 May, the allied fleet soon came in contact with it and began pursuing the Swedes. The following day the battle of Öland was fought, where the allied fleet defeated the superior Swedish fleet and secured a Danish naval superiority for the rest of the year.

After the fiasco at Öland, Charles XI ordered a commission to investigate whether anyone was to blame for the failure. The committee worked was active for over a year by gathering testimonies from various officers who had been present at the two battles. From the hearings it was evident that the Swedish forces had been poorly coordinated and that the relations between Creutz and his subordinates had hit rock bottom. Creutz was of the opinion that his subordinates had disobeyed his orders and gather all the officers for on Kronan for a meeting. Afterwards, those present testified that they had been "scolded like boys" for not following Creutz in his attempt to pursue the retreating allies. Lieutenant Admiral Christer Boije of Äpplet lost his command and his pay and was replaced by Gustav Horn while Johan Bär of Nyckeln and several other were accused of negligence and cowardice, including Creutz' son Johan on Merkurius. Many of the accused officers defended themselves by pointing out that the official orders were diffuse and imprecise, and that Creutz had not been clear in his orders. It was also claimed that he at one point had backed the sails on Kronan when he saw that his son's ship was under attack by a fireship, thereby holding up the entire Swedish line.

On the allied side, the Dutch admiral Philip van Almonde accused his Danish colleagues for shying away from battle and filed a formal complaint against Admiral Jens Rodsten for willingly avoiding battle. In his report to the Danish King Christian V and Admiral of the Realm Henrik Bielke, Juel himself noted that it far greater damage could have been inflicted on the Swedes if it hadn't been for all the confusion. According to Swedish maritime historian Gunnar Grandin, Juel was eager to push for a decisive action since he knew that the famous Dutch admiral Cornelis Tromp was going to arrive only a few days later to assume command of the allied fleet. Danish historian Jørgen Barfod has also concluded that Juel wanted to test his forces against the Swedes before he was relieved of his position as fleet commander.

== Forces ==
The numbers in parentheses indicates the number of guns for each ship.

=== Allied fleet ===
Danish ships

- Churprindsen (68), flagship, Niels Juel
- Fridericus III (64)
- Tre Løver (64)
- Christianus IV (58)
- Nellebladet (54)
- Gyldenløve (56)
- Christiania (54)
- Lindormen (46)
- Svenske Falk (46)
- Delmenhorst (44)
- Havmanden (36)
- København (36)
- Caritas (33)
- Hommeren (32)
- Hvide Falk (26)
- Havfruen (26)
- Spraglede Falk (18)

Dutch ships

- Delft (62), admiral's ship, Philip van Almonde
- Waesdorp (68)
- Gideon (60)
- Oostergoo (60)
- Noortholland (44)
- Ackerboom (60)
- Dordrecht (46)
- Campen (44)
- Wapen van Utrecht (38)
- Frisia (36)

Supporting vessels

- Fire Kronede Lilier (snow)
- Oranienbaum, Bon Adventure and two unnamed Dutch galiots
- S:t Jakob
- S:t Joris

=== Swedish fleet ===
First squadron

flaggskepp: Kronan (124), Lorentz Creutz

- Solen (74)
- Wrangel (60)
- Draken (66)
- Herkules (56)
- Neptunus (44)
- Maria (44)
- Fenix (36)
- Sundsvall (32)
- Enhorn (16)
- Pärlan (28, armed merchant)
- Tre Bröder (12)
- Mjöhund (10)
- Sjöhästen (8)
- Jakob, Svan (fireships)

Second squadron

flaggskepp: Svärdet (94), Claes Uggla

- Mars (72)
- Merkurius (64)
- Hieronymus (64)
- Svenska Lejonet (48)
- Göteborg (48)
- Fredrika Amalia (34)
- Uttern (24)
- Flygande Vargen (44, armed merchant)
- Järnvågen (24, armed merchant)
- Ekorren (8)
- Posthornet (8)
- Råbocken (8)
- Rödkritan, Duvan (fireships)

Third squadron

flaggskepp: Nyckeln (84), Johan Bär

- Äpplet (86)
- Saturnus (64)
- Caesar (60)
- Wismar (54)
- Riga (54)
- Hjorten (36)
- Solen (54, kofferdiskepp)
- Salvator (30)
- Gripen (8)
- Sjöman (8)
- Leoparden, Postiljon (fireships)

fourth squadron (divided between the other squadrons)

- Victoria (80)
- Venus (64)
- Jupiter (70)
- Carolus (60)
- Spes (48)
- Abraham (44)
- Nordstjärnan (28)
- Trumslagaren (34, armed merchant)
- Konung David (32, armed merchant)
- Elisabeth (12, armed merchant)
- Fortuna (12)
- Konung David (10)
- Måsen (8)
- Jägaren, Didrik (fireships)

== Bibliography ==
- (in Danish) Barfod, Jørgen H, Niels Juel: Liv og gerning i den danske søetat. Universitetsforlaget, Aarhus. 1977. ISBN 87-504-0386-9
- (in Danish) Barfod, Jørgen H, Niels Juels flåde. Gyldendal, Köpenhamn. 1997 ISBN 87-00-30226-0
- (in Swedish) Einarsson, Lars, Kronan. Kalmar läns museum, Kalmar. 2001. ISBN 91-85926-48-5
- (in Swedish) Johansson, Björn Axel (redaktör), Regalskeppet Kronan. Trevi, Stockholm. 1985. ISBN 91-7160-740-4
- (in Swedish) Lundgren, Kurt, Sjöslaget vid Öland. Vittnesmål – dokument 1676-1677. Lingstad Bok & Bild, Kalmar. 2001. ISBN 91-631-1292-2
- (in Swedish) Rystad, Göran (redaktör), Kampen om Skåne Historiska media, Lund. 2005. ISBN 91-85057-05-3
- (in Swedish) Sjöblom, Olof, "Slaget vid Öland 1676: Kronan går under" i Ericsson [Wolke], Hårdstedt, Iko, Sjöblom &
- (in Swedish)Åselius, Svenska slagfält. Wahlström & Widstrand, Stockholm. 2003. ISBN 91-46-20225-0
- (in Swedish) Zettersten, Axel, Svenska flottans historia åren 1635-1680 Norrtälje tidnings boktryckeri, Norrtälje. 1903.
