= Philips van Almonde =

Dutch States Navy officer

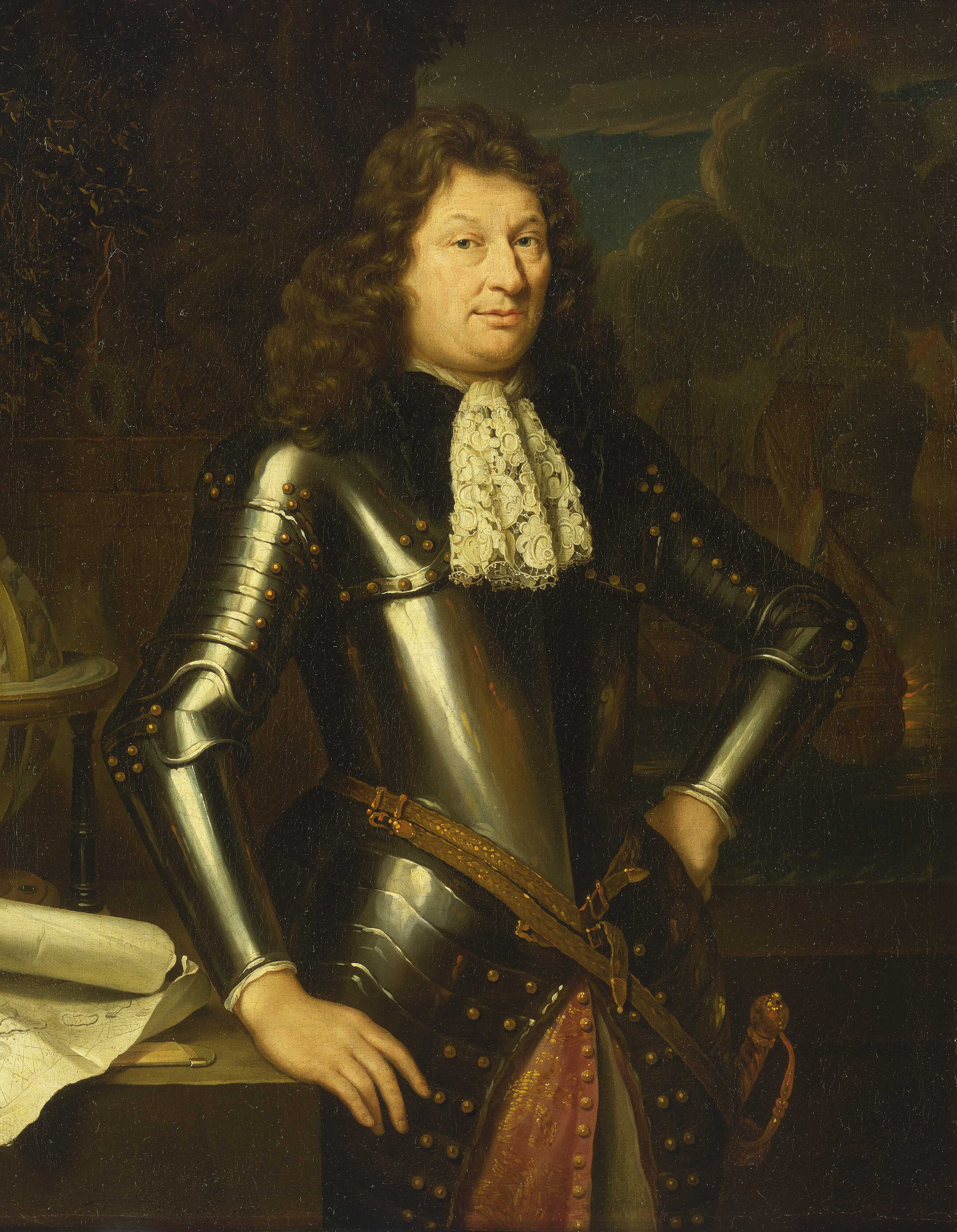
- Portrait of Almonde
- Born: 29 December 1644; Den Briel, Dutch Republic
- Died: 6 January 1711 (aged 66) Oegstgeest, Dutch Republic
- Allegiance: Dutch Republic
- Service: Navy
- Service years: 1661 to 1711
- Rank: Lieutenant-admiral
- Wars: Second Anglo-Dutch War; Battle of Lowestoft; Four Days Battle; Franco-Dutch War; Battle of Solebay; First Battle of Schooneveld; Second Battle of Schooneveld; Battle of Texel; Battle of Bornholm; Battle of Öland; Nine Years' War; 1688 Invasion of England; Cork and Kinsale; Barfleur and La Hogue; Great Northern War; War of the Spanish Succession; Battle of Cádiz; Battle of Vigo Bay; Siege of Barcelona

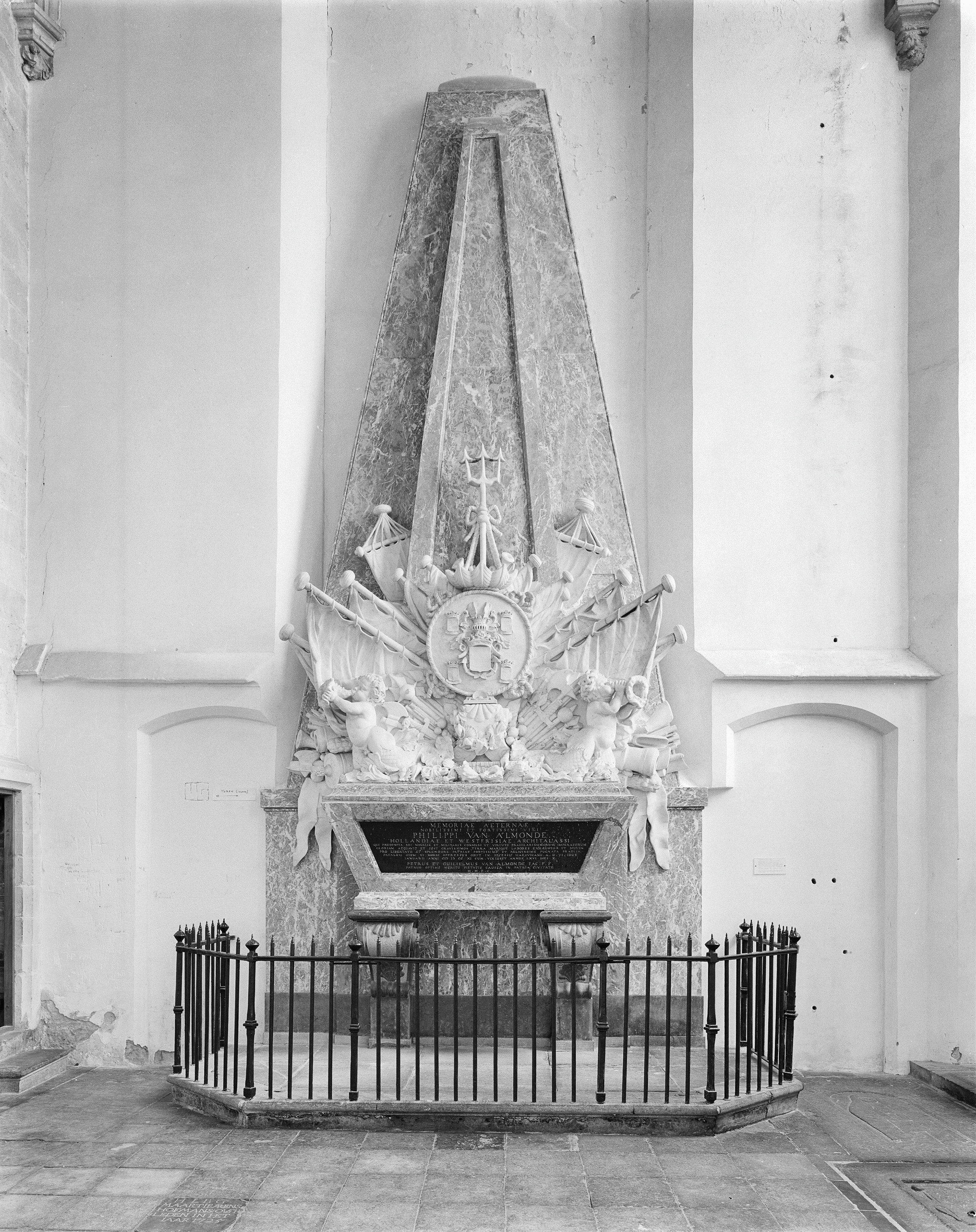
Memorial for Philips van Almonde in the Saint Catherine's Church in Brielle

Philips van Almonde (29 December 1644 – 6 January 1711) was a Dutch States Navy officer who served in his nation's maritime conflicts of the 17th and early 18th centuries.

== History ==
Philips was born in Den Briel, the son of Pieter Jansz van Almonde, a wealthy burgher. Van Almonde learned the maritime profession under his uncle, the frigate commander Jacob Cleidijck, becoming a cadet on his ship the Wapen van Dordrecht in 1661. He was appointed lieutenant in 1664 by the Admiralty of the Maze. During the Battle of Lowestoft in the Second Anglo-Dutch War he in 1665 took over command from his incapacitated uncle and was on return confirmed in his command on 14 August. He distinguished himself in the Four Days Battle of 11–14 June 1666, where Lieutenant-Admiral Michiel de Ruyter defeated a fleet under George Monck, 1st Duke of Albemarle. In 1667 he was made a full captain. In 1671 he was captain of the Harderwijk.

On 6 October 1673, during the Third Anglo-Dutch War, he was made a Rear-Admiral, after having distinguished himself as captain of the Wassenaer in the Battle of Solebay and captain of the Delft during the Battle of Schooneveld and the Battle of Texel.

In 1674 Van Almonde on the Ridderschap van Holland carried out actions against the French west coast. The following year, he accompanied Tromp's squadron in the Mediterranean. In late May and early June 1676 he commanded a squadron during the battles of Bornholm and Öland in the Baltic Sea as part of a Danish-Dutch fleet under Niels Juel and Cornelis Tromp. In the second battle the numerically superior Swedish navy was soundly defeated, granting naval supremacy to Denmark. In 1676, following De Ruyters' death, Van Almonde led the mediterranean fleet back to Holland. On 5 April 1684 he was appointed Vice-Admiral by the Admiralty of Amsterdam. During the Glorious Revolution he commanded the rear of stadtholder William III of Orange's invasion fleet.

He achieved his greatest fame, however, during the War of the Grand Alliance ("The War of the League of Augsburg"), in which the Netherlands and their allies ("The Grand Alliance") faced off against Louis XIV's France. On 28 March 1692 he was made Lieutenant-Admiral. Van Almonde on De Prins commanded a squadron in the battle at La Hougue (also known as the Battle of Barfleur) on 29 May 1692. There he assisted in Admiral Edward Russell's victory over the French, who were under the command of Tourville, by launching his long boats against the trapped French ships.

In 1702, during the War of the Spanish Succession, Van Almonde was behind a plan to seize richly-laden Spanish treasure galleons arriving from the West Indies. On 23 October, he convinced English Admiral Sir George Rooke to attack the treasure ships despite the lateness of the year and the fact that the vessels were protected by French ships-of-the-line. The Dutch and English forces in the Battle of Vigo Bay destroyed the enemy fleet in the harbor of Vigo. The English took four ships-of-the-line and six galleons, while the Dutch took six warships and five galleons that had been treasure-laden but were unloaded just before the attack. In 1706 he put down command of the Dutch fleet headed for Portugal upon hearing that he would be subordinate to an English Vice-Admiral. On 20 December 1708 he was transferred to his old Admiralty of the Maze at Rotterdam; as this was seen as the most ancient Dutch admiralty, the most honourable function in the Dutch fleet was now his.

Van Almonde later moved back to his Haaswyk estate at Oegstgeest, near Leyden, where he died on 6 January 1711. His memorial stands in the Katherine Church at Briel, where he was buried on 30 December 1712.
