= Battle of Lund =

1676 battle of the Scanian War

- Part of the Scanian War
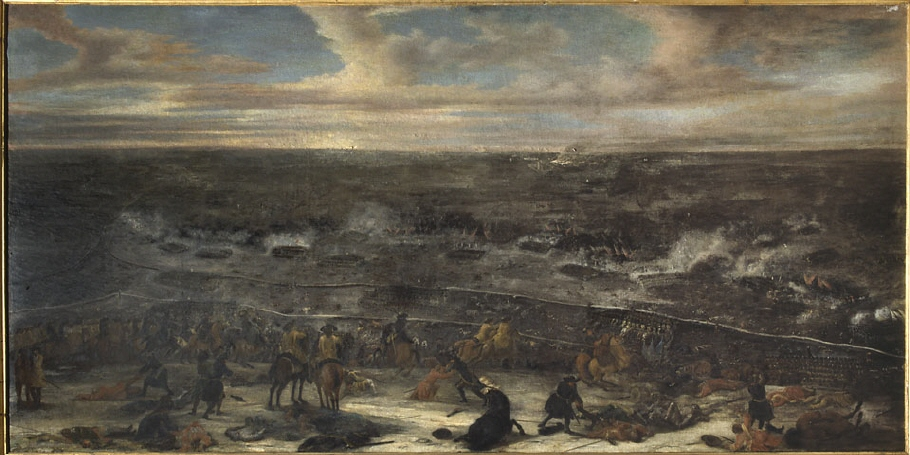
- Battle of Lund by Johann Philip Lemke
Date	4 December 1676
Location	Lund, Sweden 55°43′15″N 13°10′45″E
Result	Swedish victory

Belligerents
(yes) Swedish Empire	Denmark–Norway• Dutch Republic (sailors)

Commanders and leaders
(Swedish Empire) Charles XI (Swedish Empire) S. Grundel-Helmfelt (Swedish Empire) Johan Galle † (Swedish Empire) O. W von Fersen (POW) (Swedish Empire) H. von Burghausen †	(Denmark–Norway) Christian V (Denmark–Norway) F. von Arensdorff (Denmark–Norway) C. von Arensdorff (DOW)

Strength
8,000: 2,000 infantry; 6,000 cavalry; 12 cannons	13,000: 6,300 infantry; 6,000 cavalry; 56 cannons

Casualties and losses
3,000–4,000: 1,000–1,500 killed; 2,000–2,500 wounded; 70 captured	8,000–9,000: 2,000–2,500 killed; 4,000–4,500 wounded; 2,000 captured (Note: Including about 500 Danes who had been dispersed during or after the battle and were, possibly, subsequently killed or captured.)

The Battle of Lund, part of the Scanian War, was fought on 4 December 1676, in an area north of the city of Lund in Scania in southern Sweden, between the invading Danish army and the army of Charles XI of Sweden. The Danish had an army of about 13,000 under the personal command of 30-year-old King Christian V of Denmark, aided by General Carl von Arensdorff. The victorious Swedish army, which numbered about 8,000, was commanded by Field Marshal Simon Grundel-Helmfelt and the 21-year-old Swedish king Charles XI. It is one of the bloodiest battles going by casualty percentage of both sides ever fought in Scandinavia.

== Events leading up to the battle ==
After the Swedish defeat at the Battle of Fehrbellin and a number of Danish triumphs at sea, the Swedish military was occupied retaining their tenuous hold on dominions in Brandenburg and Pomerania.

The Danes saw this as an opportunity to regain control over the Scanian lands, which had fallen to Sweden with the 1658 Treaty of Roskilde. The Danes invaded via Helsingborg in late June 1676 with an army of 14,000 men, where they found themselves supported by the local peasantry. This made it impossible for the outnumbered Swedish troops to effectively defend the recently acquired province. After a month, only the fortified town of Malmö remained under Swedish control.

In August, a Danish detachment tried to advance north, but Swedish King Charles XI had prepared a new army in the province of Småland, and the Danish advance was halted at the Battle of Halmstad. The Swedes had gathered 14,000 men by October, of which three-fourths were mounted, and felt confident enough to march south. They slowly fought their way southwards in an attempt to break the siege of Malmö. Swedish supply lines were thin due to frequent interceptions by local peasants under the command of Danish officers.

In early November, the Danish king and his army had taken post at Lund, south of the Kävlinge River. The Danes controlled all the river crossings, and the Swedish army was forced to camp on the north side. For one month this situation endured, but snow arrived in late November, and the river surface began to freeze. On the morning of 3 December, the Swedish General of Fortifications Erik Dahlberg reported to the king that the ice would hold their weight. The Danes assumed that the Swedes had gone into winter camp and that they would not attack until the spring.

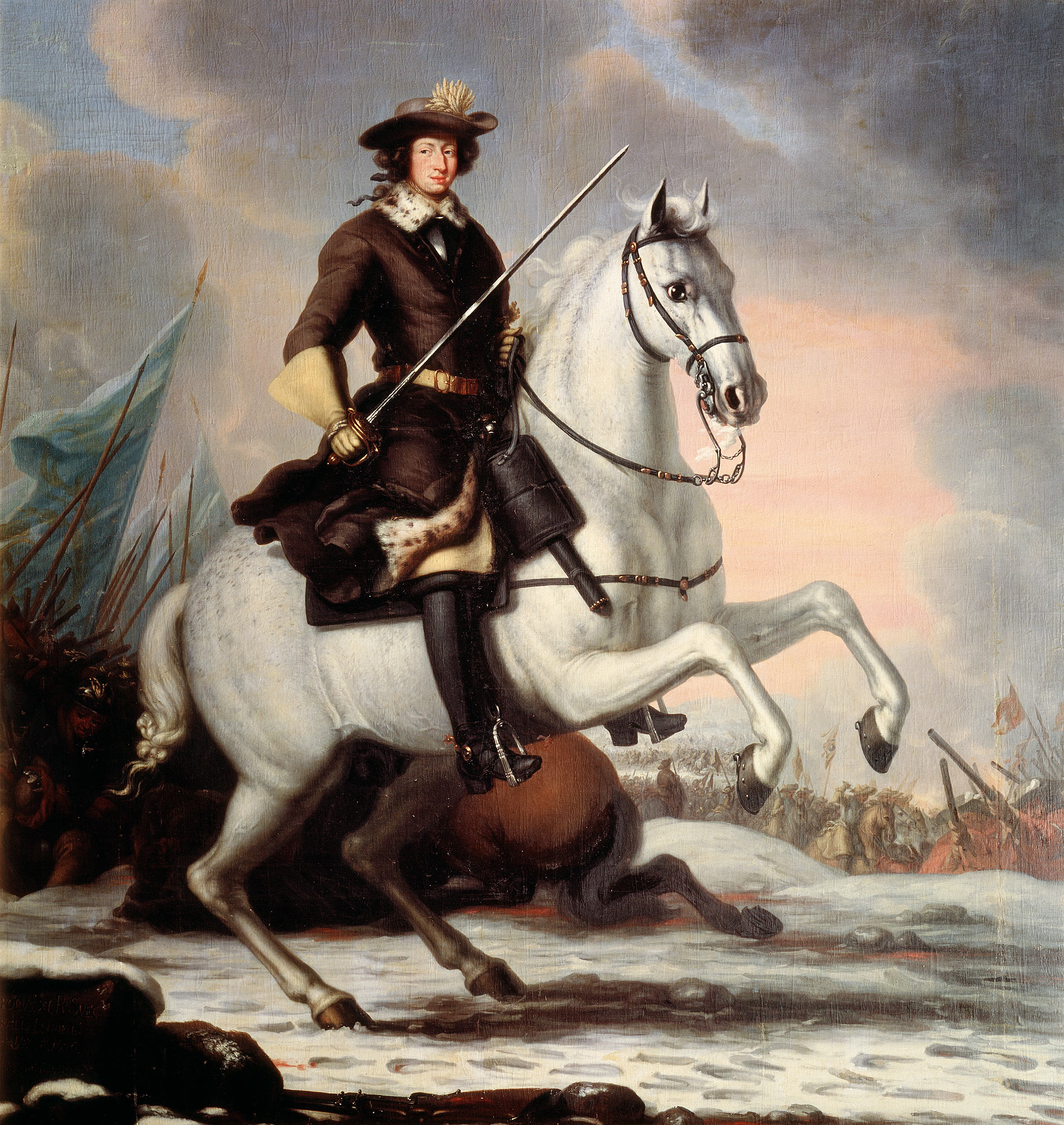
Charles XI of Sweden David Klöcker Ehrenstrahl

Hat worn by Charles XI of Sweden at the battle of Lund

== Order of battle ==
=== Swedish forces ===
Supreme Commander: Karl XI
Commander in chief: Field Marshal Simon Grundel-Helmfelt
Head of cavalry: General Rutger von Ascheberg
Quartermaster general: Colonel Erik Jönsson Dahlberg.

Command	Commander	Strength	Unit
Left wing	Lt. Gen Johan Galle †		
First line			
	Lt. Col. Elias von Hagendorn	1 squadron	Smålands cavalry
	Col. Bernhard von Mellin	5 squadrons	Viborgs läns cavalry
	Col. Per Hierta (WIA)	4 squadrons	Västgöta cavalry
	Col. Herman von Burghausen	2 squadrons	2nd Karelian dragoons
Second Line	Mj. Gen. Johan Benedict von Schönleben		
	Col. Robert Lichton	4 squadrons	Nya Adelsfanan cavalry
	Col. Hans Wachtmeister	2 squadrons	The Queen Consort life guards cavalry.
	Col. Herman von Burghausen	1 squadron	2nd Karelian dragoons
Center	Mj. Gen. Martin Schultz von Ascheraden		
First line			
	Col. Christopher Gyllenstierna (WIA)	3 battalions	Royal Life Guards of Foot
	Col. Friedrich Börstell	1 battalion	Skaraborg Regiment
	Hans Abraham Kruuse af Verchou	1 battalion	Dalarna Regiment
	Col. Lars Mörner	1 battalion	Västgöta-Dals Regiment
	Lt. Col. Georg Fredrik von Ascheberg	1 battalion	Hälsinge Regiment
	Per Larsson Örnklo	1 battalion	Norrländska tremänningar Regiment
Second line	Maj. Gen. Barthold de Mortaigne		
		2 squadrons	1st Karelian dragoons
	Col. Otto Vellingk	1 squadron	Gamla östgötar cavalry
	Col. Peter Örneklou (WIA)	1 battalion	Gästrike-Hälsinge regiment
	Vellingk/Johan Anders von der Pahlen (WIA)	1 squadron	Gamla östgötar cavalry
		1 squadron	2nd Karelian dragoons
	Col. Abraham Cronhjort		Småländska dragoons, "sjättingar"
Right wing	Gen. Rutger von Ascheberg		
First line	Lt. Gen. Otto Wilhelm von Fersen (WIA):		
	Col. Gotthard Johan von Budberg	2 squadrons	1st Karelian dragoons
	Lt. Col. Hans Henrik von Siegroth	1 squadron	King's Drabants
	Lt. Gen. Nils Bielke	5 squadrons	Life Regiment of Horse
	Col. Claes Johan Baranoff	4 squadrons	Åbo-Viborg cavalry
Second line	Mj.Gen. Johan Leonard Wittenberg (WIA).		
	Lt. Col. Wilhelm Mauritz von Post (WIA)		Skåne-Bohusläns dragoons
	Lt. Col. Kasper Goës	1 squadron	Attached Dragoons
	Col. Johan Drake	2 squadrons	Adelsfanan cavalry
	Col. Kristoffer von Gyntersberg (Günthersberch)	2 squadrons	Adelns fördubbling i Götaland cavalry
	Col. Hans Andersson Ramsvärd	1 squadron	Gamla smålänningar cavalry
	Col. Carl Gustav Rehnskiöld	1 squadron	Civilstatens bevilling cavalry

=== Unit sizes ===
Squadron: 2 cavalry companies.
Battalion: 4 infantry companies.
Cavalry company: ca 75 riders.
Infantry company: ca 50 soldiers.
On average a squadron had 150 riders and a battalion 200 soldiers. Because of detachments, disease and desertions the units were rarely at full strength.

=== Danish forces ===
Supreme Commander: Kristian V
Commander in chief: General Carl von Arensdorff (DOW)

Command	Commander	Strength	Unit
Left wing	Mj. Gen. Anders Sandberg		
	Mj.Gen. Anders Sandberg	3 squadrons	3rd Jyske cavalry regiment
	Col. Mogens Kruse		Jyske adelsfanen "rostjeneste" cavalry
	Conrad Reventlow	3 squadrons	2nd Fynske cavalry regiment
	Col. Jacob von Bülow	3 squadrons	2nd Jyske cavalry regiment
	Col. Gotfried Rauch		Rauchs cavalry regiment
	Col. Conrad Brinck	1 battalion	Sønderjyske regiment
	Carl von Arensdorff	3 squadrons	4th Jyske cavalry regiment
	Col. Jörgen Brockenhus	3 squadrons	Brockenhus dragoons
Center	Maj. Gen. Joachim von Schack		
First line	Maj. Gen. Joachim von Schack		
	Mj. Gen. Siegwert von Bibow (Bibou)	2 battalions	Kongens life regiment
	Col. Dietrich Busch	2 battalions	Prins Georgs regiment
	Col. Jakob Vilhelm Stuart	1 battalion	Stuarts regiment
	Col. Hans Georg von der Schulenburg (POW)	1 battalion	Duke of Croys regiment
	Lt. Gen. Thomas Meldrum	2 battalions	Prins Frederiks/Field Marshal Wehers
	Erhom	2 battalions	Dronningens life regiment
Second line	Col. Johan Caspar von Cicignon		
	Col. Ditlev Lütken	1 battalion	Lütkens regiment
	Egedius Kristof Lützow	1 battalion	4th Jyske regiment
	Col. Johan Caspar von Cicignon	1 battalion	1st Fynske regiment
		3 battalions	Tromps sailors
	Col. Bartold Bülow	1 battalion	3rd Jyske regiment
	Col. Konrad Brinck	1 battalion	Duke of Plöns
Right wing	Lt.Gen. Friedrich von Arensdorff		
First line	Mj. Gen. Hans Wilhelm Meerheim		
Second line	Col. Ditlef Rantzau †		
	Col. Ditlef von Örtzen	3 squadrons	Örtzens dragoons
	Lt.Col. Carl Adolf von Plessen. (POW)	2 squadrons	Horse guards
	Mj.Gen. Hans Wilhelm Meerheim	3 squadrons	Life Regiment of Horse
	Col. Hans Frederik Friedrich Levetzow	3 squadrons	1st Jyske cavalry regiment
	Col. Kristian Kristoffer Holck †.	2 squadrons	Sjællandske adelsfanan "rostjeneste"
	Lt.Gen. Gustaf Adolf Bauditz (Baudissin)	2 squadrons	Bauditz regiment
	Col. Ditlef Rantzau	2 squadrons	2nd Sjællandske cavalry
	Lt.Col. Bernhard Christopher Kaas	3 squadrons	1st Fynske (Duncans) cavalry
	Lt.Gen. Friedrich von Arensdorff	3 squadrons	1st Sjællandske cavalry

== Battle ==
Before daybreak the Swedish army broke camp and made preparations to cross the river. The Swedes had 2,000 infantry and 6,000 cavalry at their disposal; their Danish opponents had more than 5,000 infantry, 6,000 cavalry, in addition to a few hundred Dutch sailors—in all, about 13,000 men. Under the cover of a moonless night, between 04:00 and 05:30, the entire Swedish force successfully crossed the river and reached the southern bank without alarming the Danes. The Swedes planned to attack the sleeping Danish camp with cavalry from the southeast. Reconnaissance patrols reported that the ground between the two armies was unsuitable for mounted troops, so King Charles XI and his generals gathered to discuss the new situation. Most advisers pointed out that it would be foolish to attack by foot as the Danish army possessed much more infantry and the Swedish main strength lay in its cavalry. Additionally, the Swedes would likely lose the element of surprise during the long march towards the Danish camp. The king was eager to attack at once, but was swayed by his advisers. He ordered the troops to advance towards the hills just outside the north wall of Lund, to seize a tactical advantage. The hills would mean better terrain for the cavalry and the town itself would cover the Swedish southern flank. By then the Danes had woken, and soon recognised the Swedish intentions. The Danes quickly broke camp and started to race the Swedes for control of the hills. The first skirmish was between the Swedish right wing and the Danish left wing, and ended in a draw. However, the hills were secured under Swedish control, and the Danes were pushed to the east.

The main battle began at 09:00, at sunrise. The front now stretched one kilometer from north to south, with the Danes to the east and the Swedes to the west. The Danish army was supported by 56 cannon of various calibers, while the Swedes brought only eight six-pounders and four three-pounders. Once the fighting commenced, Charles XI personally led a flanking maneuver to overwhelm the Danish left flank. During the fighting, the Danish commander Carl von Arensdorff was badly wounded, and the entire left wing was forced to retreat at 10:00, severely crippling the Danish army. Von Arensdorff would later die from gangrene after amputation. Charles XI and Field Marshal Simon Grundel Helmfelt used their cavalry to pursue fleeing Danish troops and cut down any who lagged behind. The pursuit continued for eight kilometers, right up to the river. Some officers at the Danish camp attempted to ward off the Swedes, but many Danes were forced onto the ice. The ice did not hold, and a great number of the remaining Danish left wing drowned.

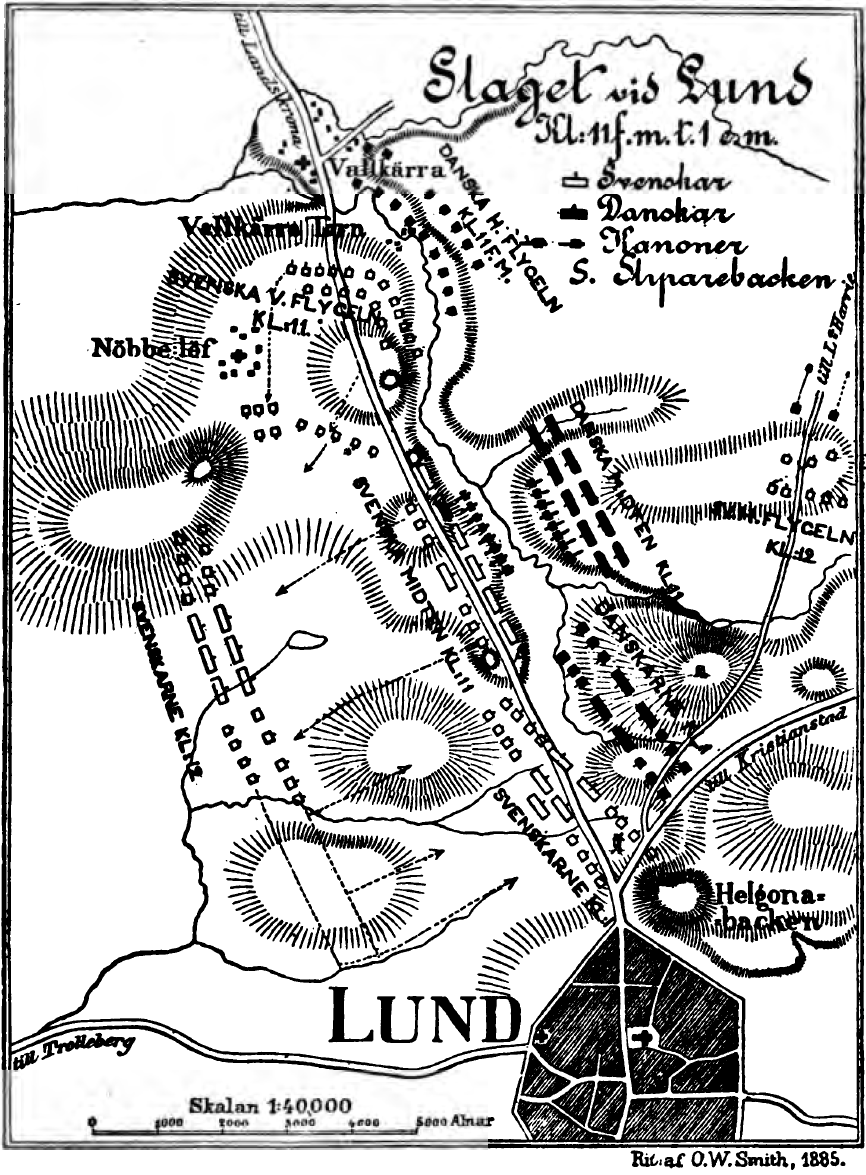
Battle of Lund 1676

While the Danish left wing fled, the right wing pushed the Swedes back until the Swedish left wing scattered with its commander lieutenant general Johan Galle killed. With the absence of Danish King Christian V and with General Arensdorff wounded, Friedrich von Arensdorff, the general's brother, had assumed command of the Danish army. The Danish front was now facing south and the Swedish forces found themselves under constant attack with their backs against the town wall. The situation for the Swedes was desperate, as there had been no sign of the king, the Household cavalry, or the Field Marshal for hours. The Swedes were also greatly outnumbered, with approximately 1,400 infantry and 2,500 cavalry, as the Danes approximately counted 4,500 infantry and 2,100 cavalry. However, instead of forcing the attack, Friedrich von Arensdorff ordered the army to regroup at noon, halting the battle.

At the river, the Swedish king was contemplating his next move. Available intelligence from the town was scarce, and suggested that the whole Danish army was on the run. Although he was tempted to rout the fleeing Danish cavalry all the way to Landskrona, he decided to return to his army instead.

The battle at Lund renewed, and the Swedes were forced back once more. At sunset (about 15:00) the Swedish king returned from the north with his cavalry, combined with some cavalry units from the scattered Swedish left wing. He decided to try to circle the Danish army to the west to join the remains of the Swedish center. Danish commander Arensdorff made the decision to halt the offensive on the Swedish center and instead tend to the enemy cavalry in the northwest.

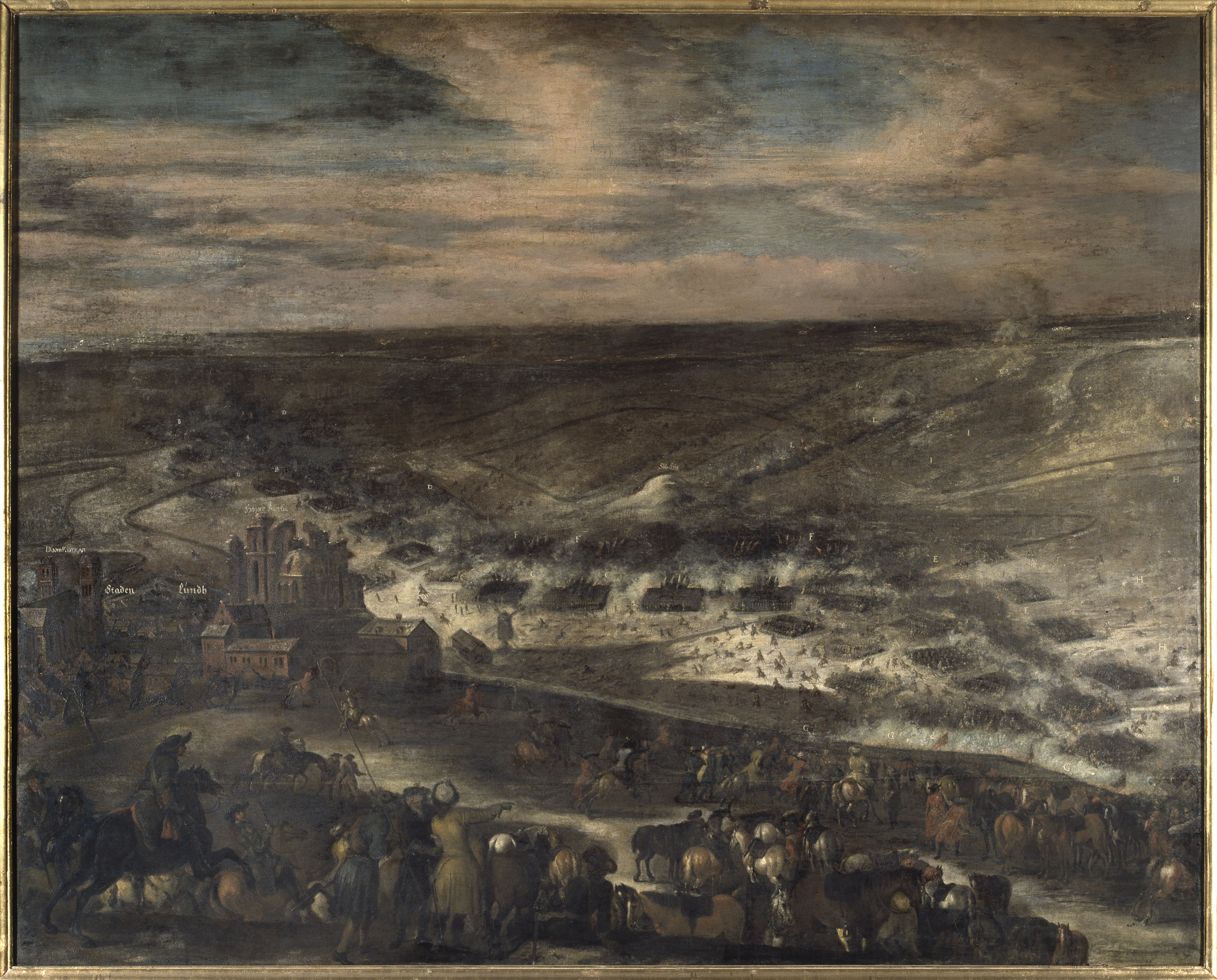
Battle of Lund, secondary engagement - Johann Philip Lemke

Charles XI, two generals, and three guards broke through the Danish lines to join the diminished Swedish center. While Arensdorff was still attacking the cavalry in the north, the return of the Swedish king inspired the exhausted troops, who attacked the Danish forces in the back. Though the Danes still outnumbered the Swedes, by approximately 4,500 to 4,000, Arensdorff had lost the initiative and after half an hour his army disintegrated. Charles XI wanted to clear the field of Danish soldiers. The remaining Danish cavalry quickly disappeared into the night. Although Danish General Siegwert von Bibow protected the infantry retreat, many of the Danes were massacred until Field Marshal Helmfelt ordered the killing to stop and the surrendering Danish soldiers were spared. At 17:00 a ceasefire was sounded.

== Aftermath ==
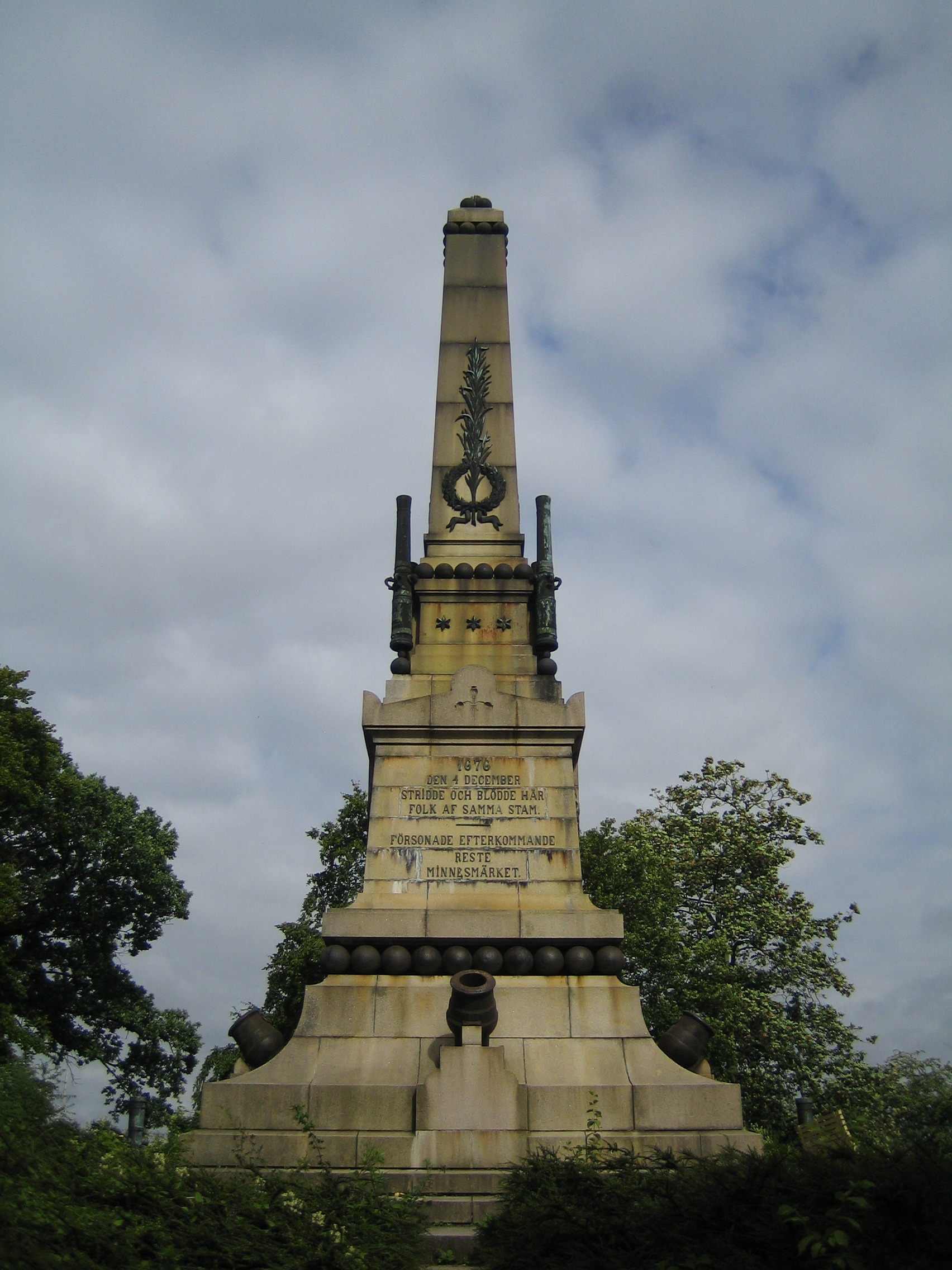
Monument commemorating the Battle of Lund, erected in 1876. Translation: "Here fought and bled people of the same tribe. Reconciled descendants erected the memorial"

Although the bodies were counted the next day, the original notes have been lost and the exact death toll is unknown. Contemporary Swedish sources indicate that between 8,300 and 9,000 were buried, excluding the Danes that drowned and soldiers that died from their wounds over the following weeks; however, it is likely that the peasants burying the bodies inflated the reported numbers for economic reasons, as suggested by author Gustaf Björlin, or that they included soldiers that had died of sickness and other reasons prior to the battle. One contemporary Danish source talks about a total of 9,300 dead. More realistically, the total deaths on the battlefield amounted to between 3,000 and 4,000 men, of which about 1,000 or slightly more were Swedes. The Swedes also had 2,000 men severely wounded after the battle, and perhaps 500 or so lightly wounded. According to Danish sources, their army had but 5,000 combat-ready men after the battle. Swedish sources, on the other hand, estimates that only 400 infantry and 2,500 Danish cavalry made it out unharmed; this number does not include artillery personnel or officers. At least 1,500 Danes had been captured and another 500 or so had been dispersed (of which many were subsequently killed or captured). The Dutch sailors had been exceptionally unfortunate; according to various sources, only a few dozen out of the 1,300 survived. According to Anders Fryxell, only 47 of the Dutch sailors survived.. The battle severely crippled both armies, seeing as it was extremely bloody when taking into consideration the casualties in comparison to the total number of combatants.

The Swedish victory is often attributed to the composition of their army, as it contained far fewer mercenaries than the Danish army. The Swedish mix of cavalry and infantry made it possible for the Swedes to mount swift counterattacks as soon as a friendly infantry unit buckled. The Danish still used the caracole tactic, undermining the speed and agility of their cavalry.

The victory at Lund boosted the morale of the Swedish army. Charles XI was criticized for getting carried away by his success on the right flank, but the battle made him popular with his troops. The remaining Danish forces were forced to retreat to the fortress of Landskrona. Reinforced by their Austrian and German allies, they would once again meet the Swedish army at the Battle of Landskrona eight months later.

== See also ==
- Scanian War
- History of Scania

== Notes, citations and sources ==
=== Sources ===
- Rystad, Göran (2001). Karl XI: en biografi. Historiska Media. ISBN 978-91-89442-27-6.
- Rystad, Göran (2005). Kampen om Skåne. ISBN 91-85057-05-3.
- Bjerg, Hans Christian; Frantzen, Ole L. Danmark i Krig (2005). ISBN 87-567-7269-6
- Holm, Nils F. (Ed.) Det svenska svärdet (1948).
- Isacsson, Claes-Göran. Skånska kriget 1675–1679 (2000). ISBN 91-88930-87-4
- Wahlöö, Claes; Larsson, Göran (1999). Slaget vid Lund. Ett mord och icke ett fältslag (in Swedish). ISBN 91-88930-38-6.
- Slaget vid Lund (English Version, Swedish Version), Visit Lund Website, Retrieved Sep.1, 2017.
- Jensen, N. P. (1900). "Christian V i Slaget ved Lund" [Christian V at the Battle of Lund]. Historisk Tidsskrift (in Danish). 7 (2).
- Stark, Kennet (2019), "De 8357 döda i slaget vid Lund", Populär Historia (in Swedish)
