= Arenstorff =

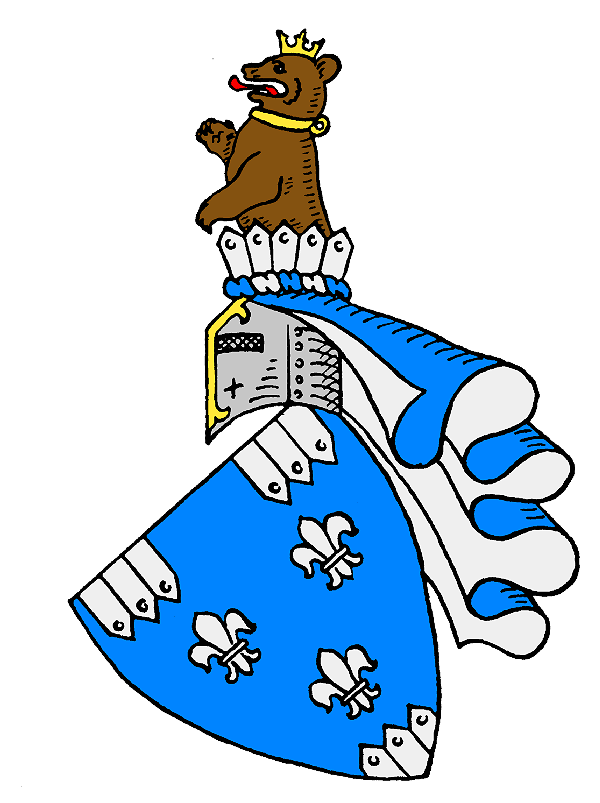
Coat-of-arms of the von Arenstorffs

The Arenstorff family, also Arnstorff, is the name of a German noble family of ancient nobility originated from Uckermark, Brandenburg.

== History ==
The family appeared for the first time in the records on 29 September 1306 with Ludolf de Arndesdorp , with whom the main line also began. The clan obtained the naturalization into the nobility of Denmark on 24 April 1670 for Friedrich von Arensdorff, who later became the commanding General in the Royal Danish Army, councilor and the Governor of Schleswig and Holstein.

In the Einschreibebuch [Book of Registers] of the Dobbertin Abbey, there are 13 entries for the daughters of the A(h)renstorff family for the years between 1723 and 1910 from Krümmel (Lärz), Sadelkow and Oyle in the Grafschaft [County of] Hoja for the admission into the noble community at the Dobbertin Abbey.

== Coat of arms ==
In Blue 3 (2.1) silver lilies, accompanied by silver portcullises, six growing out of the top edge on the sides and three from the bottom edge of the shield. On the helmet with a blue and silver mantle, from a five-piece portcullis, arises a gold-crowned natural bear with a collar.

== Notable Members ==
- Carl von Arensdorff (1625–1676), commanding General in the Armies of Denmark, Sweden and the Netherlands
- Friedrich von Arensdorff (1626–1689), the brother of the preceding, commanding General in the Armies of Denmark and Sweden and the Governor of Schleswig and Holstein
- Hans Adolf von Arenstorff (1895–1952), Generalmajor [Major General], Ritter, and Landowner

== Literature ==
- (de) Genealogisches Taschenbuch der Ritter- und Adels-Geschlechter, Band 2, 1877 [Genealogical Handbook of the Families of Knights and Nobles, Volume 2, 1877], Brünn (now Brno), Irrgang, 1877
- (de) Deutschen Adelsgenossenschaft[German Cooperative of the Nobility], ed., Jahrbuch des Deutschen Adels, Zweiter Band, 1898 [Yearbook of the German Nobles, 2nd Volume, 1898]. Berlin, W. T. Bruer, 1898, pp. 1-14
- (de) Hans Stratowa, Wiener Genealogisches Taschenbuch 1927/28 [Viennese Genealogical Handbook 1927/28], Band III. Wien, Carl Gerold u. Sohn, 1927–28, p. 141a
- (de) Walter von Hueck, ed., Genealogisches Handbuch des Adels, Adelige Häuser, Reihe A, Band XI, Band 49 der Gesamtreihe [Genealogical Handbook of the Nobility, Noble Houses, Series A, Volume XI, Volume 49 of the Whole Series]. Limburg an der Lahn, C. A. Starke Verlag, 1971, ISSN 0435-2408
- (de) Walter von Hueck, ed., Genealogisches Handbuch des Adels, Adelslexikon Band I: A-Bon, Band 53 der Gesamtreihe [Genealogical Handbook of the Nobility, Dictionary of the Nobility Volume I: A-Bon, Volume 53 of the Whole Series], Limburg an der Lahn, C. A. Starke Verlag, 1972, ISSN 0435-2408
- (de) O[tto]. T[itan]. von Hefner, J. Siebmacher's grosses und allgemeines Wappenbuch, III. Band, 6. Abteilung; Der blühende Adel der Großherzogthümer Mecklenburg [Johann Ambrosius Seibmacher's Great and Complete Book of Armorial Bearings, 3rd Volume, 6th Part; The Flowering Nobility of the Grand Duchy of Mecklenburg]. Nürnberg, Bauer & Raspe, 1858, Plate 1
