= Robert Lichton =

Swedish Army general (1631–1692)

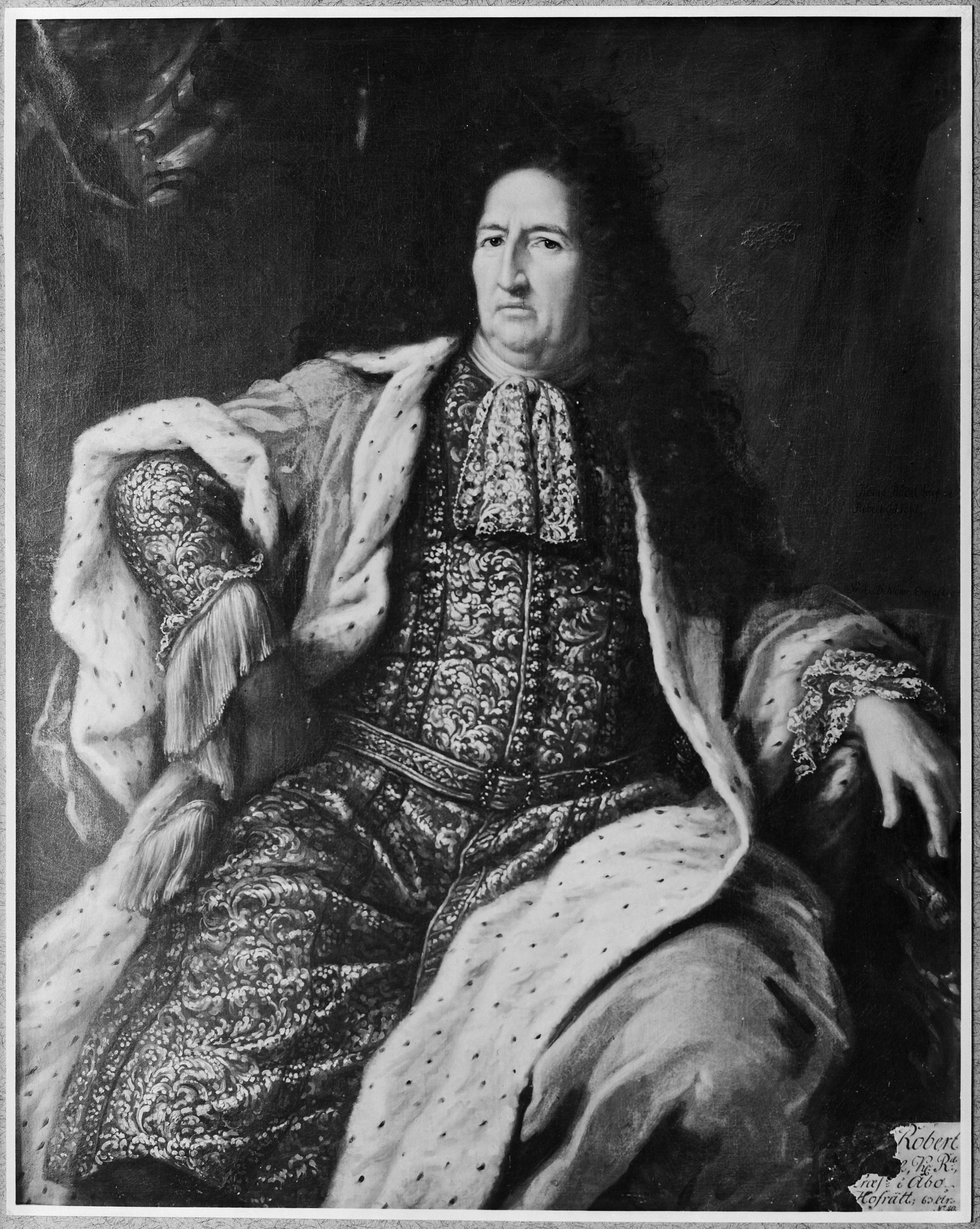
Robert Lichton

Robert Lichton (1631–1692), also Leighton, Lichtoun, Lichtone, Lyton, Lord of Ulishaven, Forfarshire, Scotland and Lord of Tervik, was a lieutenant general in the Swedish Army and president of the Superior Court of Justice (hovrätt) at Åbo (Turku).

== Career ==
Robert Lichton was born in 1631 at Humsland in Borgå (Porvoo) parish of the Swedish Empire (now Finland) to parents of Scottish and Finnish descent. He was the son of Colonel John Lichtoun of Ulishaven (died 1636) and Catharina Gutherie. When his father fell at the Battle of Wittstock during the Thirty Years' War, Robert, while still a child, inherited his estate of Tervik. At the age of fifteen he entered the Swedish Army as a private and a Musketeer and participated in campaigns in Germany, Poland and Denmark. In 1661 Lichton joined the Swedish House of Nobility as a nobleman. He was promoted to the rank of colonel in 1675 and created a baron. Lichton was appointed Governor of Estonia (Estland) He received this honor at just age fifty in 1681 while a major general.

He rose to the rank of lieutenant general in the Swedish army in 1685 and was appointed president of the Superior Court of Justice at Åbo (Turku) just two years later. At this same time he was created a Royal Counselor, titled Count and Baron of Ulishaven, Lord of Tervik and of Perheniemi. Lichton greatly distinguished himself at the Battle of the Sound. At the Battle of Lund (1676), brave to the point of being foolhardy he was hit by several bullets, none of which were extracted. Lichton greatly distinguished himself at the Battle of the Sound.

Lichton was extremely strong and had a reputation for having a violent temper. He once had to leave the country after killing a regimental surgeon but was pardoned after paying a substantial fine. In Stockholm in 1667 he attacked a Colonel Bine with sword and pistol, for which he was arrested, but later was allowed to quietly go free with no formal charges. He was made a count by King Charles XI of Sweden in 1687. The King attended Lichton's funeral in person in 1692.

== Scottish heritage ==
Although born in Sweden, Robert identified himself as Scottish. Before Robert was born, his father, John Lichton, found himself in financial difficulties owing to his own father's debts. He sold his lands of Ulishaven in Forfarshire to Sir David Carnegie of Kinnaird for £40,000 Scots and paid his father's creditors. He saw an opportunity in becoming a Mercenary for Gustavus Adolphus of Sweden to fight in the Thirty Years' War. John Lichton emigrated to Sweden in 1614 where he began his career there as an ensign in a cavalry regiment.

Sometime after 1675, he petitioned for a "birth brief" to allow him to register his arms with the Lord Lyon King at Edinburgh, which he did. (Note: It is not clear if he visited Scotland to accomplish this or not, but otherwise he was not known to have visited Scotland in his lifetime.) His arms were: Argent, a Lion Rampant gules, armed and langued azur; crest a palm tree vert; motto: "Per adversa virtus" (courage through adversity). His change in motto from the old "Licht On" was probably in reference to his father's restoring the fortunes of this house.

== Family ==
He was apparently married but had no male issue.
