= Friedrich von Arensdorff =

Friedrich von Arenstorff
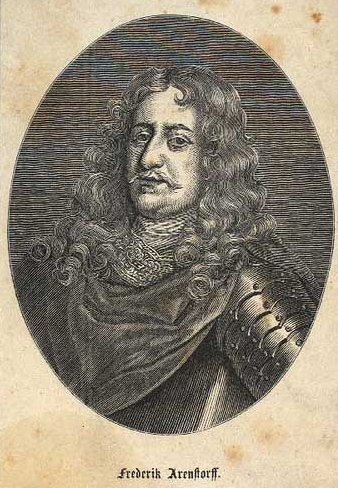
- Born: 1626; Mecklenburg
- Died: 1689 (aged 62–63); Denmark
- Military career
- Allegiance: Sweden; Denmark
- Branch: Swedish Army; Royal Danish Army
- Service years: 1645 – 1689
- Rank: Supreme Commander
- Conflicts: Copenhagen (1660); Scanian War (1675 – 1679): Battle of Lund

Friedrich von Arenstorff (Danish: Frederik von Arenstorff) (1626 – 1689) was a German born officer in Swedish and Danish military service. He played a crucial role in the Battle of Lund and was commander-in-chief of the Danish army between February and August 1678 and again in 1688-1689. He also played an important role in the Griffenfeld scandal in 1676.

== Military career ==
=== Early years ===
Arenstorff/Arensdorf was born at Rosenow in Mecklenburg. He had at least four siblings but was closest with his brother Carl von Arensdorff who also became a successful military man. In 1645 Friedrich began his military career in the Swedish Army in Poland and took part in the siege of Copenhagen in 1660. After the death of King Charles X Gustav of Sweden in 1660, political changes in Sweden made the situation less profitable for foreign officers. Friedrich was granted permission to leave his position by Queen Hedvig Eleonora in May 1661. Originally, he had planned to return to Germany but when he visited the Danish court, King Fredrick III offered him a position as head of the new cavalry lifeguards. In 1672 he became an assessor in the Royal Danish Military Academy. In 1673 he was promoted to major general and in 1675 to general lieutenant. By then, he was a naturalised Dane and he learnt to speak and write excellent Danish. Friedrich was married to the Danish noble lady and wealthy heiress Christence Lykke between 1661 and 1667 when she died. They had several children. In 1669, he married Augusta Elisabeth von Rumohr with whom he had at least ten children and their eldest son, Christian, later His eldest son Christian later wrote a short biography of his father's and his uncle Carl's lives. When Chancellor Griffenfeld fell out of grace in 1675, it was Friedrich von Arensdorff whom the king sent to arrest him.

=== The Scanian War ===
The Battle of Lund on 4 December 1676 was the largest field battle in Scandinavia ever. Friedrich von Arensdorff commanded the Danish right wing. His brother Carl von Arenstorff was second commander-in-chief after King Christian. Unfortunately Carl was wounded at the very beginning of the battle at about 9 am. King Christian left the battle towards noon, together with the nominal second-in-command, Anders Sandberg. From that moment, Friedrich von Arensdorff effectively commanded the remains of the Danish army. He tried to call the king and Sandberg back by firing a three-times-three Danish salute with their artillery guns.

He was wounded both at Lund and during the Battle of Landskrona in 1677 and later claimed that the king would best know to trust him by looking at his scars. At Landskrona, Arensdorff led the left wing and the king the right wing. However, this too, was a crushing defeat.

In February 1678, Arensdorff became commander-in-chief of the Danish army in Scania, a position he was most reluctant to accept, but the king insisted. In the summer of that year, the Danish main army set out to lift the Swedish siege on Kristianstad. King Christian was keen to face the Swedes in another field battle, Arensdorff was reluctant and the rest of the war council was uncertain. In the end, the Danes gave up the whole enterprise and left the commander of Kristianstad, Carl Heinrich von der Osten, to negotiate honourable terms. During this disastrous summer campaign, Arensdorff signed orders to both regular officers and irregular friskytter captains to torch and destroy several cities and castles in Scania. The king and the war council had signed off these orders beforehand. However, only a few of these locations were destroyed, amongst them about one-third of the city of Lund, the castles of Hovdala and Mölleröd and then the order was revoked. After the Danish army's return to their headquarters at Landskrona, Arensdorff was relieved from his duties.

Days later Arensdorf was charged with treason, defamation against the dignity of the king and reluctance to liberate Kristianstad. He claimed that he was innocent of treason and had never meant the king ill, but admitted that he had thought the Danish army in a position that would not allow for a field battle and that he had been most wroth when speaking with the king about this. At the first stage, Arensdorf was condemned to lose his honour, property and life but after the Scanian War, he was reprieved by the King. According to C.J.W von Arenstorff's biography, the main reason that Friedrich fell into disgrace was that he had offended the king in public when they argued about the siege of Kristianstad.Others believe that the main reason was that Christian V needed a scapegoat.

Later Years and Death In 1686, he was made commanding general in Schleswig-Holstein and in 1688 he again became commander-in-chief of the Danish army. In 1689, he died and was buried in Udbyneder Church in Randers.
