= Vombsjön =

Lake in Skåne County, Southern Sweden

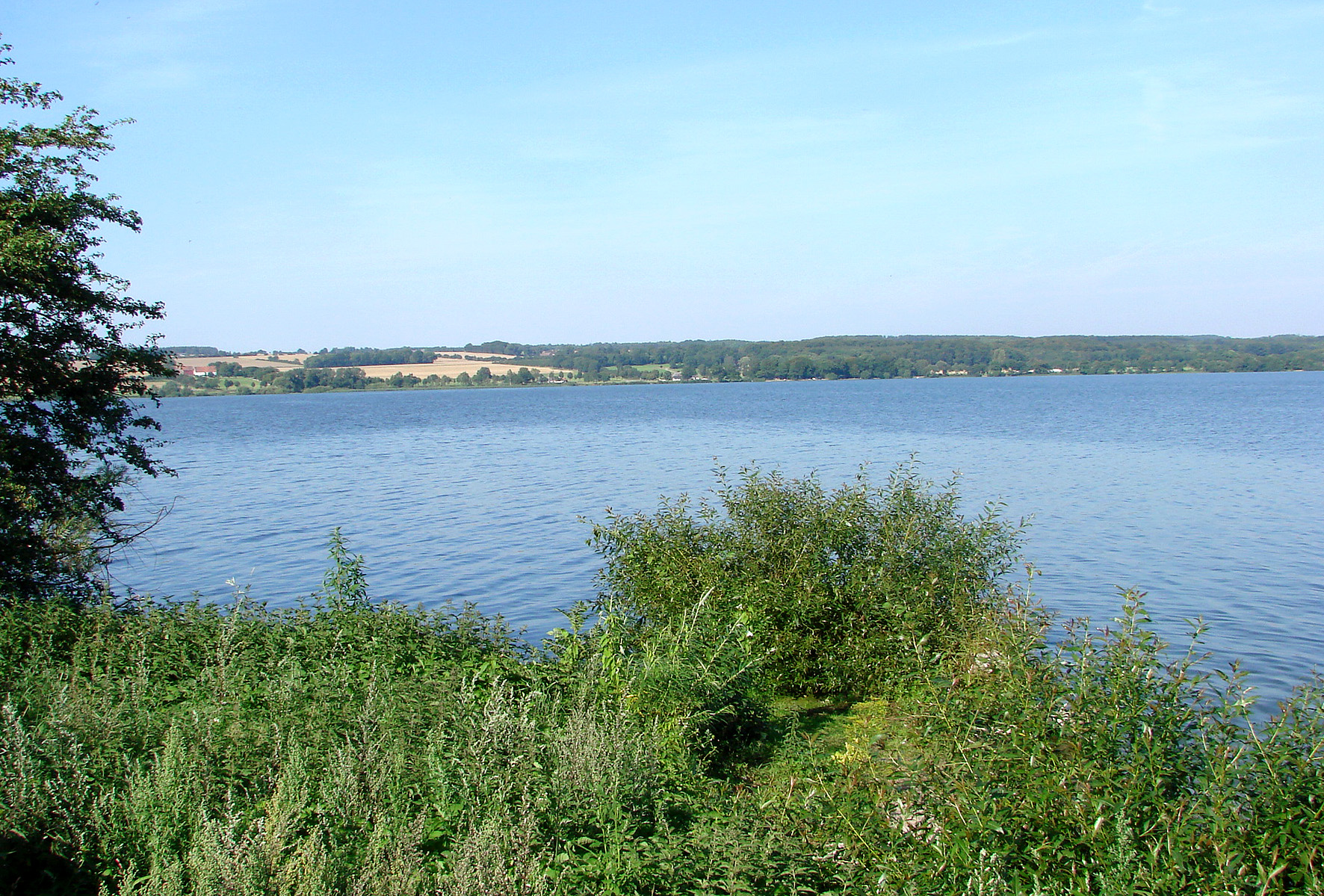

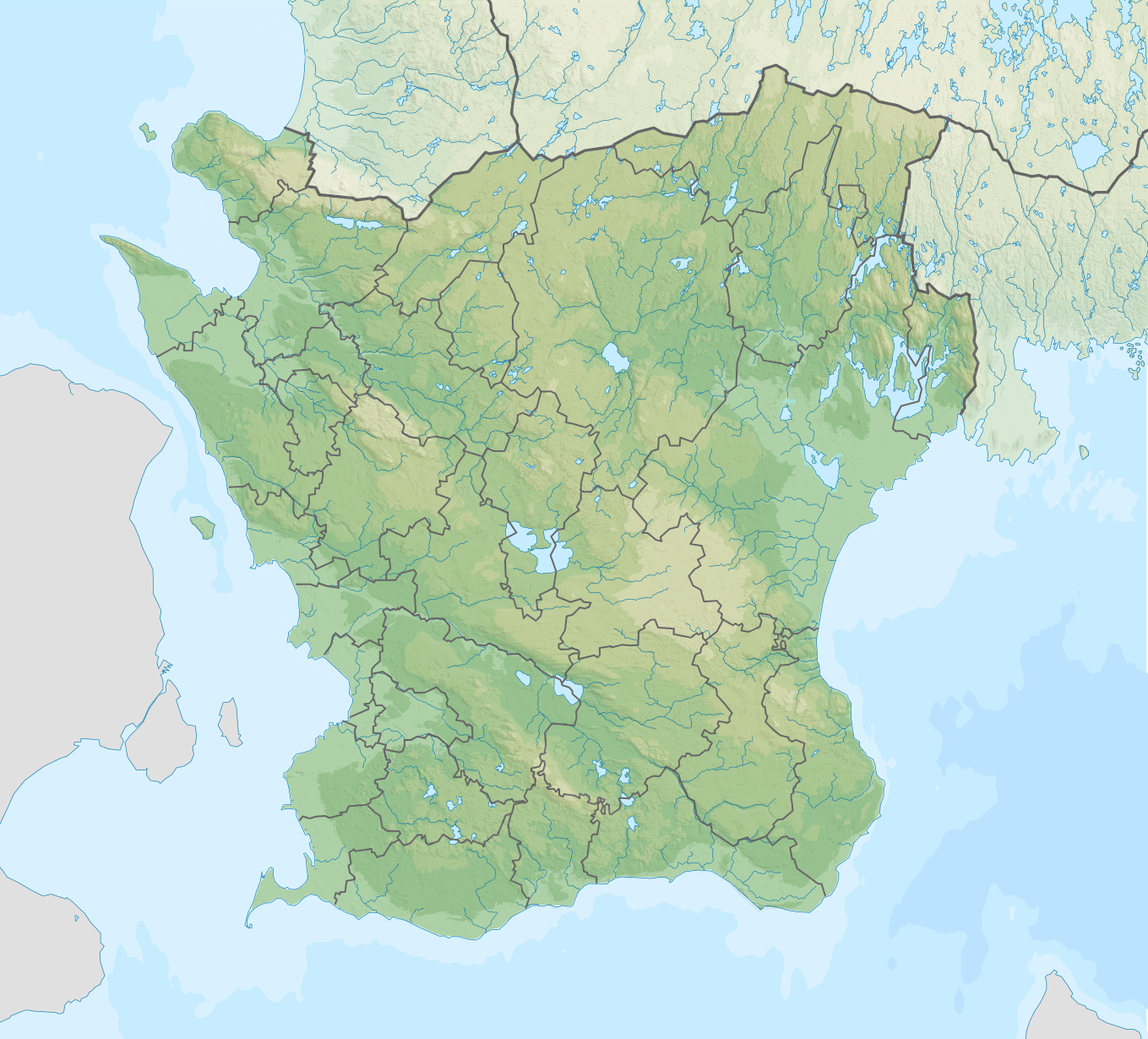
- Location within Skåne Location within Sweden
- Location: Skåne County, Sweden
- Coordinates: 55°40′N 13°35′E
- Primary inflows: Björkaån, Borstbäcken
- Primary outflows: Kävlinge River
- Surface area: 12 km^{2} (4.6 mi^{2})
- Average depth: 6.6 m (22 ft)
- Max. depth: 16 m (52 ft)
- Water volume: 78.274 km^{3} (18.779 mi^{3})
- Surface elevation: 20 m (66 ft)

Vombsjön (sometimes called Våmbsjön) is a lake in Scania, Sweden. It is located 20 km to the east of Lund and lies in the municipalities of Lund, Eslöv and Sjöbo. The lake has been the source of drinking water for Malmö since 1948. Its watershed is 447 km^{2}.
