= Deathbed =

A deathbed is a place where a person dies or lies during the last few hours before death.

Deathbed or Death Bed may also refer to:

- Death Bed: The Bed That Eats, a 1977 horror film
- "Death Bed (Coffee for Your Head)", a 2020 single by Powfu featuring Beabadoobee
- "A Death-Bed", a 1918 poem by Rudyard Kipling
- "Deathbed", a song by Relient K from the 2007 album Five Score and Seven Years Ago
- "Deathbed", a song by There for Tomorrow from the 2009 album A Little Faster
- "Deathbeds", a song by Bring Me The Horizon from the 2013 album Sempiternal

== See also ==
- Deathbed confession, a confession of some sort when someone is assumed to be close to death
- Deathbed conversion, a religious-faith conversion which takes place on a deathbed
- Deathbed phenomena, a phenomenon in which people on their deathbed claim to experience paranormal sensations
- or
- or
- Dying declaration, testimony of a dying person
