= Battle of Halmstad =

1676 battle of the Scanian War

- Part of the Scanian War
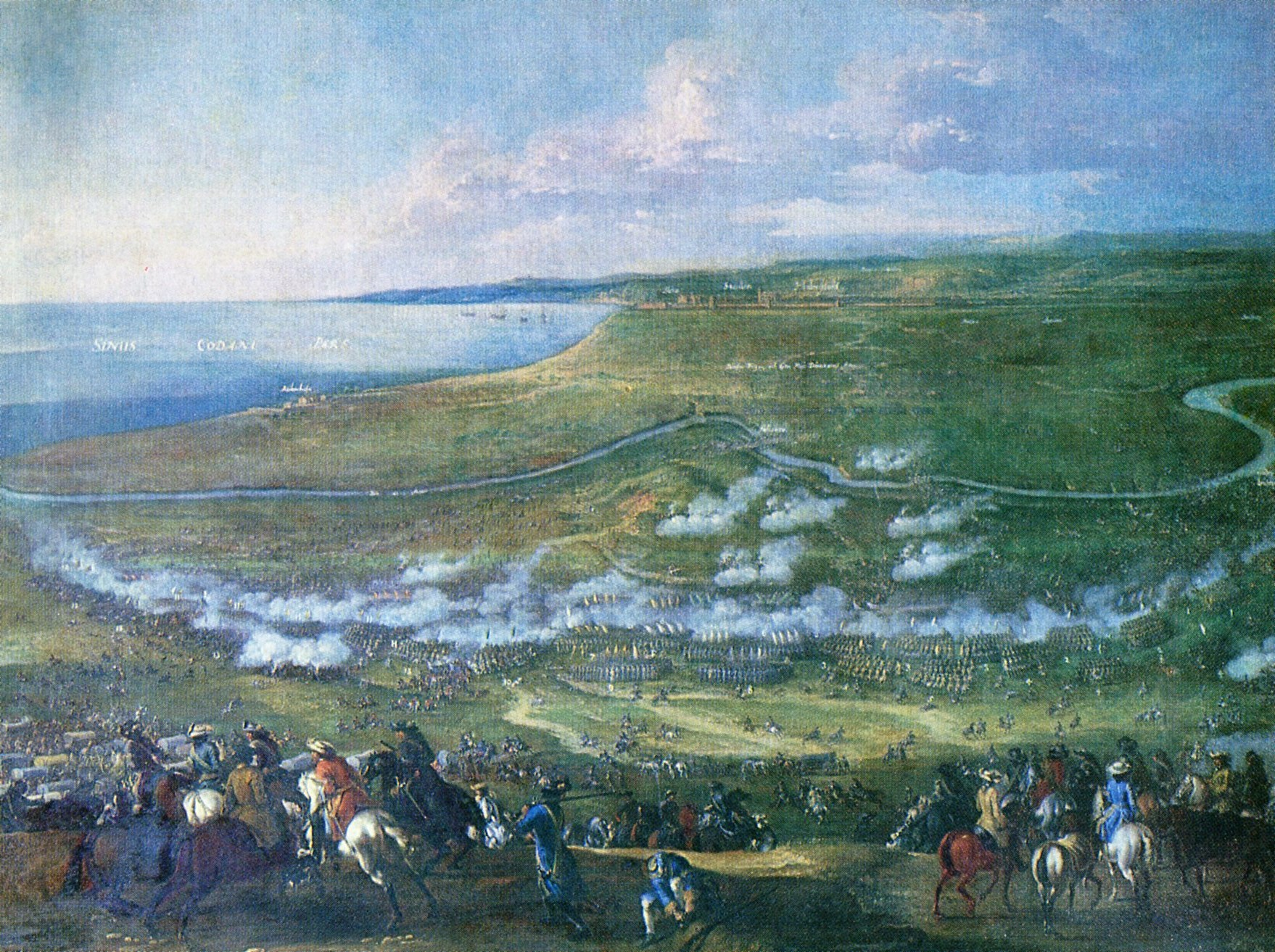
- Battle of Halmstad by Johann Philip Lemke
Date	17 August 1676
Location	Fyllebro, near Halmstad, Sweden
Result	Swedish victory

Belligerents
(yes) Swedish Empire	Denmark–Norway

Commanders and leaders
(Swedish Empire) Charles XI (Swedish Empire) Simon Grundel-Helmfelt (Swedish Empire) Rutger von Ascheberg	(Denmark–Norway) Jacob Duncan

Strength
6,000 men	3,500–4,000 men

Casualties and losses
200: 41 killed 144 wounded	3,000: 1,000 killed 2,000 captured

The Battle of Halmstad, also known as the Battle at Fyllebro, was fought on 17 August 1676, at Fyllebro, approximately 4 km (2.5 mi) southeast of the town of Halmstad in the province of Halland in southwest Sweden. It was the last battle fought in Halland between Denmark and Sweden.

== Prelude ==
King Christian V of Denmark and the Danish army that landed at Råå near Helsingborg in Scania in late June 1676 managed to conquer almost the whole province in less than a month. The Swedish army had to retreat north to Växjö.

In early August, Major General Jacob Duncan, a native Scot, was sent north, to Halland, with about 4,000 Danish troops to take the key-town of Halmstad and if possible advance further north to join forces with General Ulrik Frederick Gyldenløve, who had reached Gothenburg with a Norwegian army and was threatening to lay siege to the city.

On 10 August King Charles XI of Sweden received information that Duncan was moving towards Halmstad. On 11 August he and his field army headed west to intercept Duncan. On 12 August Duncan laid siege to Halmstad. King Christian soon informed him of the Swedish troop movements and ordered Duncan to retreat to the town of Laholm, on the south bank of the river Lagan. However, the Swedes had destroyed the bridge at Laholm. The Danes rested overnight and set out for the Fyllebro bridge, which Duncan had destroyed earlier to prevent the Swedes from crossing; Duncan ordered his men to repair the bridge. Early in the morning of 17 August the Swedish army seized the road between Halmstad and Laholm, cutting off Duncan's route south. Duncan mistakenly thought that he was dealing with small scouting parties because there were no infantry troops to be seen. He had sent out scouts who not only made contact with the Swedish cavalry but joined their rear without being recognised, but they had not spotted the infantry.

== Battle ==
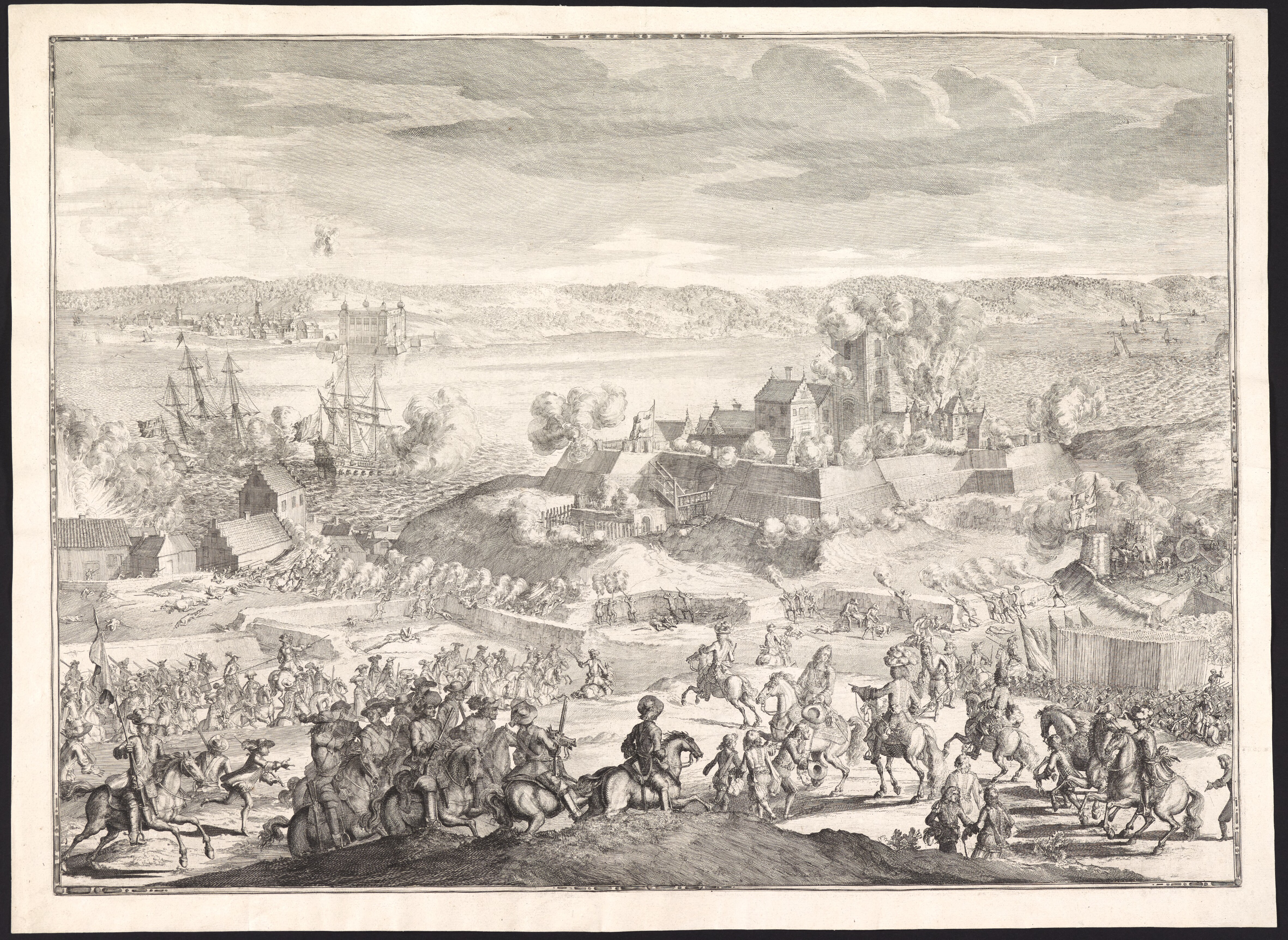
Battle of Helsingborg, 1676

When Duncan's troops crossed the River Fylleån, General Rutger von Ascheberg and 600 Swedes moved forward against the Danes. The Swedish vanguard under Ascheberg's command had already encountered a small Danish unit that was heading north. After a short chase, Ascheberg found himself face-to-face with Duncan and his forces. The bridge was too small and narrow to let Duncan's men retreat en masse. Unaware of the danger, he let his troops assume battle formations on the south bank with their backs against the river. Duncan sent his infantry and dragoons forward under artillery cover against the Swedish infantry that was just arriving. At this point the Swedish army moved swiftly forward. 7,000 Swedes faced 3,500–4,000 Danes. At noon on 17 August Duncan was trapped.

The battle started with a salvo from the few cannons the Swedes had, whereupon Charles XI and his household cavalry charged down the hills to attack the Danish right wing. Soon the Swedes also charged on the left wing and in the centre. After 15 minutes, the Danish left wing was scattered. In the centre, the Danish infantry put up a determined fight, with a powerful counter-attack from a cavalry unit trying to break through the Swedish lines, but only one squadron made it through.

At this point, Duncan had realized his mistake and ordered his remaining troops to retreat back across the bridge. But the Swedish cavalry on the right wing found a ford and started moving fresh cavalry squadrons across the river. Understanding that the battle was lost, Duncan surrendered. The action probably lasted for little more than an hour, although some Swedish sources claimed it only lasted a quarter of an hour.

The Danish losses were heavy: 1,000 had died and 2,000 were taken prisoner. Out of these latter, 469 men accepted enrolment in the Swedish army. The Danish sources report large numbers of wounded being carted to the army hospital in Helsingborg and causing chaos in the small town - exactly how many wounded were taken there is not certain.

The Swedes only lost 185 men, of whom 3 officers and 38 common soldiers were dead, according to the Swedish sources. This corresponds quite well with the Danish sources that state that 150 Swedes were taken prisoner and brought to Helsingborg.

== Aftermath ==
The defeat at Halmstad dealt a hard blow to the Danish plans to advance north and join forces with the Norwegian army. The day after the battle the King Christian V broke camp and left Kristianstad and started marching towards Halmstad. On 5 September he reached Halmstad and laid siege to the town with no result. Three weeks later he returned to Scania to prepare winter quarters.

The Battle of Halmstad was also 20-year-old King Charles XI's first major victory. It was an important morale boost for him, his generals, and the whole Swedish army. The army was still much too weak to confront the Danes in Scania and marched north to Varberg to await more troops.

== See also ==
- Scanian War
- History of Scania

== Sources ==
- Rystad, Göran (2005). Kampen om Skåne [The fight for Skåne] (Revised ed.). Lund: Historiska Media. ISBN 91-85057-05-3.
