= Johann Philip Lemke =

German-Swedish graphic artist, etcher and battle painter (1631–1711)

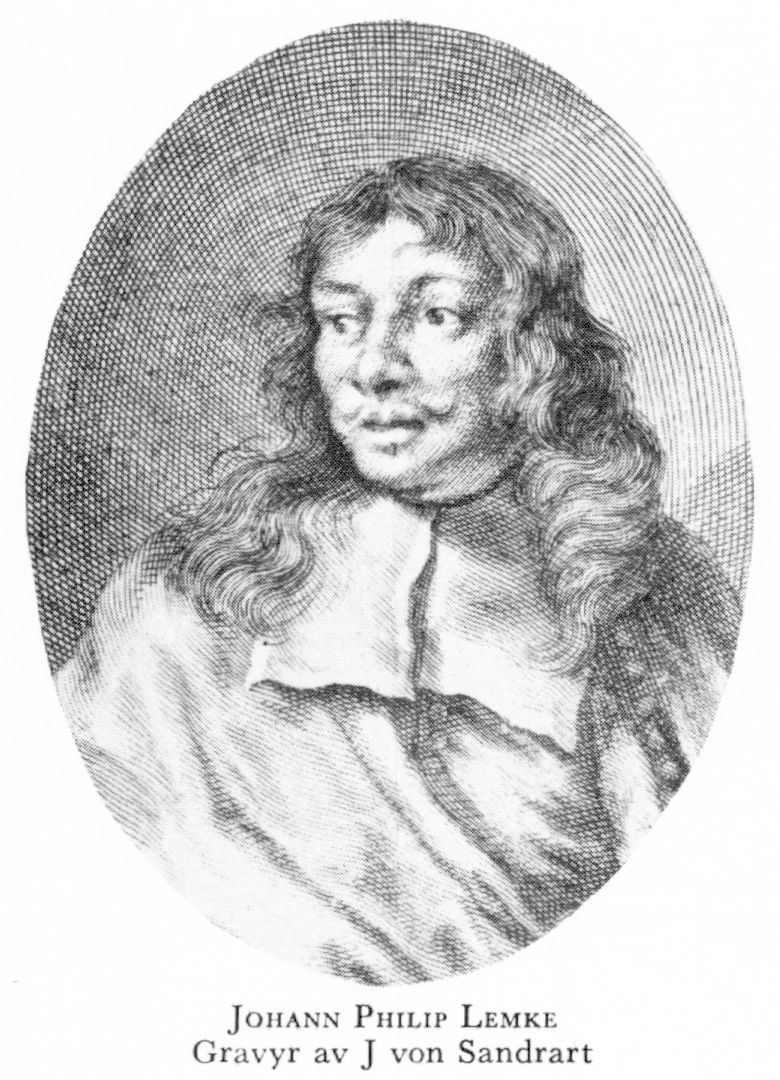
Johann Philip Lemke engraving by Joachim von Sandrart (before 1688)

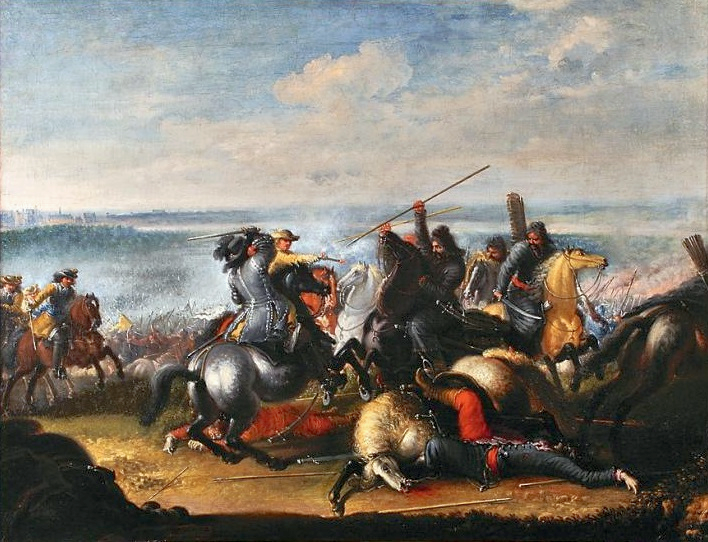
King Karl X in a skirmish with Polish Tatars at the Battle of Warsaw

Johann Philip Lemke, also given as Lembke or Lemcke (19 May 1631, Nuremberg – 3 April 1711, Stockholm) was a German-Swedish graphic artist, etcher and battle painter.

== Biography ==
His father was a sergeant in the Civil Guard during the Thirty Years' War. Despite the chaotic situation, he was able to attend school in Hamburg and, from 1642 to 1647, studied art with Jacob Weyer. He then went to Haarlem, where he studied with Jacob de Wet from 1649 to 1651. After that, he returned to Nuremberg and worked as an assistant to the etcher, Georg Strauch (1613–1673). In 1653, he was registered as a "Master" by the city of Nuremberg for his painting of the Israeli children against the Amalekites.

He spent the years 1653 to 1673 in Italy, mostly in Rome, where he came under the influence of the battle painters, Jacques Courtois and Pieter van Laer. In the 1660s, his paintings came to the attention of Eric Dahlberg and David Klöcker Ehrenstrahl and, most likely upon the latter's recommendation, was called back to Sweden to become the official battle painter for King Karl XI.

In 1684, he began a series of paintings for the upper gallery in Drottningholm Palace, including the Battle of Halmstad and the Battle of Lund. This was followed by paintings depicting the exploits of King Karl X in the lower gallery, for a total of twenty-four scenes. During the 1700s, these works suffered from the effects of unprofessional cleanings. In 1806, Anders Fredrik Skjöldebrand had some of them made into engravings.

He painted a similar series of battle scenes for Karlberg Palace. He also created a large number of etchings with Biblical themes and smaller paintings that he left unsigned. Many of those were initially attributed to other artists. Occasionally, he took on students, the best known of which is probably Carl Gustaf Tessin who, although he never became a painter, was inspired to amass a significant art collection. Daniel Stawert is also of some note.

His works may be seen at the Nationalmuseum, the Uppsala University Library and the Göteborgs konstmuseum, among several others.
