= Carl von Arensdorff =

Carl von Arenstorff (1625–1676) was an officer born in Mecklenburg, who served with the Swedish, Danish and Dutch armies. He was a brother of Friedrich von Arenstorff.

== Military career ==
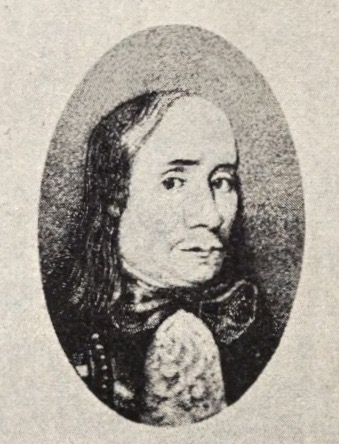

Carl von Arenstorff served with the Swedish king Charles X Gustav during the Second Northern War. Arenstorff distinguished himself as an excellent cavalry officer and was promoted Major General. He was dismissed from the Swedish army on his own request.

In 1673 he entered service with the Danish king Christian V and was a member of the king's council (Geheimeråd).

When the Scanian War began he was temporarily in Dutch pay and was called back to Denmark. He became Commander-in-Chief of the Danish army in Scania when Duke Holstein-Pløn was dismissed on 1 October 1676, after having differences with the King. Although he had been a successful cavalry officer, he performed poorly as a commander when compared to his predecessor. Disagreements in the king's council led to poor planning of vital parts of the deciding battle on Swedish ground.

Carl von Arenstorff was badly wounded by a bullet to his right arm in the initial phase of the Battle of Lund. He was shipped to Copenhagen but died from gangrene, after amputation, on 10 December 1676. In the king's correspondence hence after, Carl von Arenstorff was praised posthumously for his service.
