= Kävlinge River =

Kävlinge River Lödde å
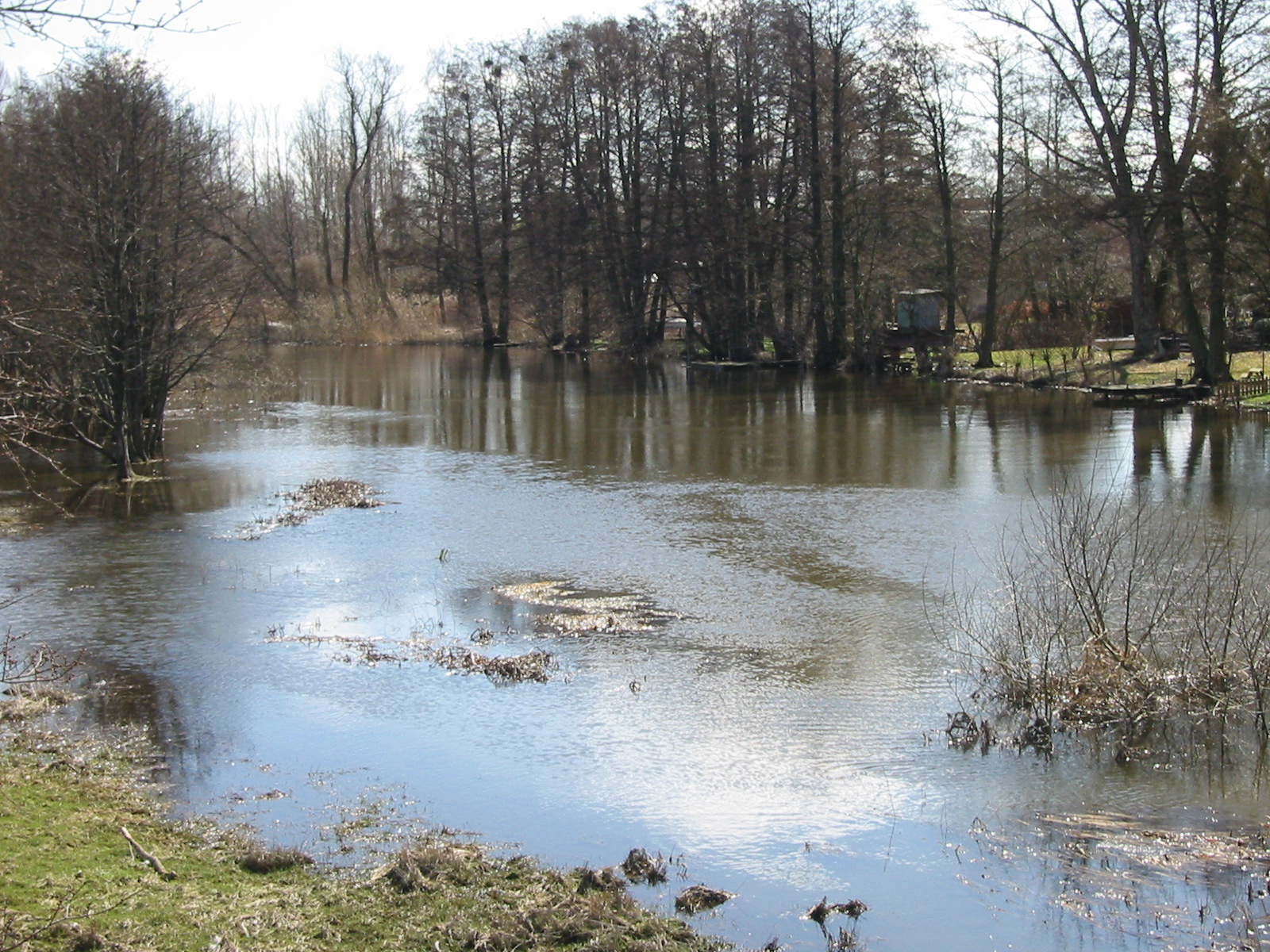
- Kävlinge River near Gårdstånga
- Native name: Kävlingeån (Swedish)

Location
- Country: Sweden
- County: Skåne

Physical characteristics
- Source: Vombsjön
  - coordinates: 55°41′54″N 13°33′19″E
  - elevation: 19 m (62 ft)
- Mouth: Lommabukten in Öresund
  - coordinates: 55°43′45″N 12°59′45″E
  - elevation: 0 m (0 ft)
- Length: 90 km (56 mi)
- Basin size: 1,203.8 km^{2} (464.8 sq mi)

Kävlinge River (Kävlingeån in Swedish, but also known as Lödde å between the town of Kävlinge and the mouth near Löddeköpinge) is the name of a small river on the flat lands of Scania in southern Sweden.

It starts at the lake Vombsjön and ends in the Öresund strait. The river is only 50 km long but played an important role in the Battle of Lund in 1676.
