= Simon Grundel-Helmfelt =

Swedish field marshal and governor (1617–1677)

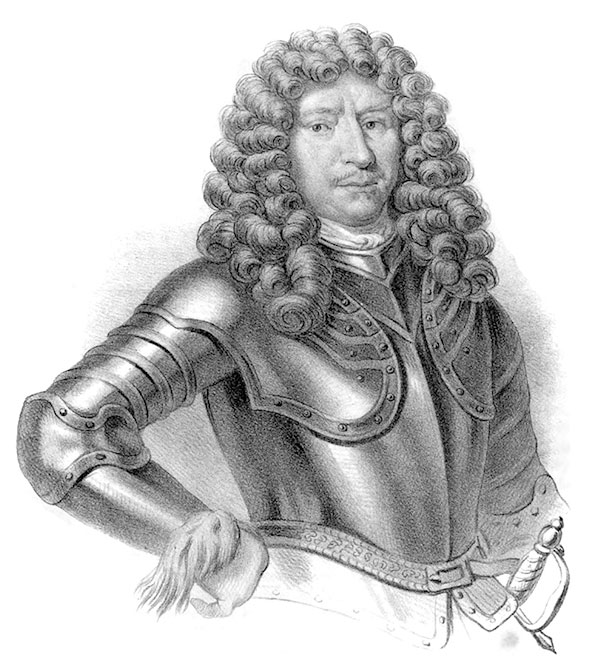
Simon Grundel-Helmfelt

Baron Simon Grundel-Helmfelt (25 September 1617 – 14 July 1677) was a Swedish field marshal (Fältmarskalk), military engineer, governor-general and member of the Privy Council of Sweden. He served during the Thirty Years' War, the Second Northern War and the Scanian War, rising to the rank of field marshal in 1668. He is particularly known for his successful defence of Riga against a Russian siege in 1656 and his role in the Swedish victories at the Battle of Halmstad and the Battle of Lund in 1676. He was killed at the Battle of Landskrona the following year.

== Biography ==
Grundel-Helmfelt was born in Stockholm on 25 September 1617, the son of Jacob Grundel, a burgomaster of Stockholm, and Elisabeth Depken. Initially intending to pursue a diplomatic career, he accompanied the Swedish statesman Johan Skytte on an embassy to England in 1634–35. He subsequently served as a secretary to the Swedish resident Peter Spieringk in The Hague.

During his time in the Dutch Republic, he developed an interest in military engineering and studied the construction and defence of fortifications, including studies at Utrecht in 1640–41. After returning to Sweden, he abandoned his diplomatic ambitions in favour of a military career.

He served in the Thirty Years' War from 1641 and distinguished himself at the Battle of Breitenfeld and received his first commission.

He was knighted in 1646, when he changed his name from Grundel to Grundel-Helmfelt. Later that year he was wounded outside Rain am Lech by a musket bullet. In 1649 he was promoted to colonel of the Artillery and in 1655 to general of the Infantry. In 1656, he was appointed governor of Riga, where he successfully defended the town against Tsar Alexei and his army of 90,000 men. He became governor-general of Ingria in 1658.

Helmfelt returned to Stockholm in 1676 to become commander-in-chief of the Swedish Army during the Scanian War. He was killed the following year at the Battle of Landskrona.
