= Battle of Landskrona =

Swedish-Danish battle (1677)

- Part of the Scanian War
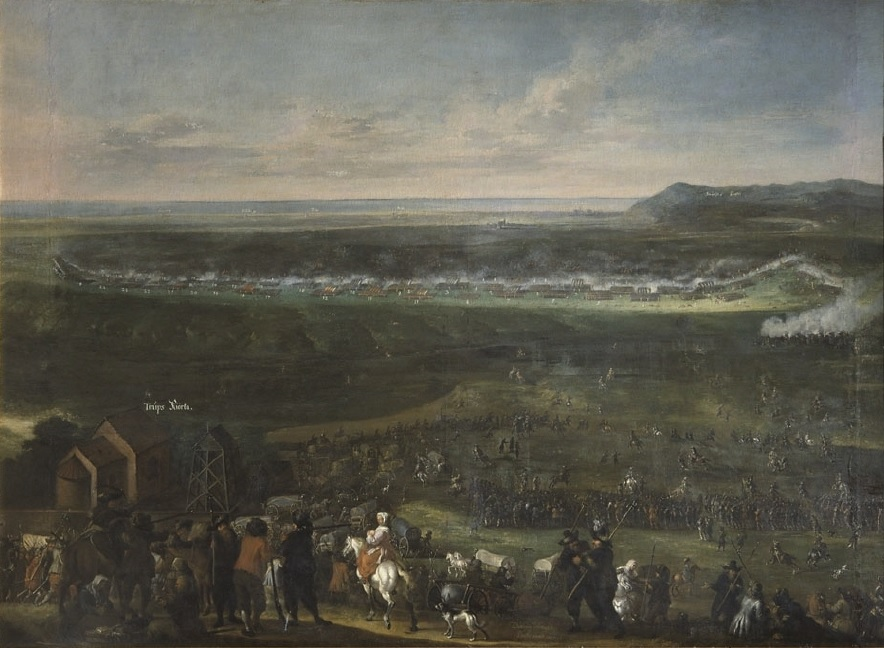
- Battle of Landskrona: painting by Johann Philip Lemke
Date	14 July 1677
Location	Landskrona, Sweden 55°54′N 12°59′E
Result	Swedish victory

Belligerents
(yes) Swedish Empire	Denmark–Norway

Commanders and leaders
(Swedish Empire) Charles XI (Swedish Empire) Simon Grundel-Helmfelt †	(Denmark–Norway) Christian V (Denmark–Norway) Joachim Rüdiger von Goltz

Strength
13,000: 5,000 infantry 4,000 cavalry 4,000 peasants	12,000: 5,000 infantry 7,000 cavalry

Casualties and losses
1,800 killed, wounded and captured	2,500 killed, wounded and captured

The Battle of Landskrona was a battle in the Scanian War, fought between Denmark and Sweden. It occurred on Ylleshed moor, outside the town of Landskrona, in the province of Scania in what is now southern Sweden on 14 July 1677.

== Prelude ==
On 12 July the Swedish army of 10,000 men had been reinforced with 4,000 peasants from Småland and left its camp near Klippan to march south. The Swedes planned to attack the Danish army that had been weakened by losses at Malmö before reinforcements could arrive from Germany and Austria via Landskrona. The Danes however, had already returned to Landskrona and camped on the hills west of the town.

== Battle ==
Early in the morning of 14 July, Charles XI formed his army into four columns and started advancing towards the Danes. But as soon as the Swedes got the enemy camp in sight they noticed that it was empty. This caused some confusion among the Swedish generals. Most of them assumed that Christian V had retreated to Landskrona and that the Swedes should abort the operation. However Charles was determined to deliver battle and kept his army marching towards the Danish camp.

During the night Christian had moved his army down from the hills and lined it up behind an earth wall with the intention of ambushing the Swedes on the moor. The Swedish General Ascheberg spotted the Danish troops behind the wall. The Swedish army paused for about one hour and at nine o'clock formed itself into two lines at the north-east end of the moor. Although his generals advised against it, Christian decided to leave his favorable position behind the wall and attack the Swedes. The two armies started advancing towards each other and were soon separated only by a small valley. The artillery exchanged fire but none of the sides were willing to attack across the dale.

Finally Charles XI and his guard on the right wing charged down the slope and up the other side. They were immediately surrounded and almost taken prisoner, but saved by the Household cavalry. The rest of the Swedish right wing followed and the battle began. After less than one hour the Danish left wing was routed and the Danish artillery was in Swedish hands.

On the Danish right Christian V out-flanked the Swedes and when Field Marshal Simon Grundel-Helmfelt was killed the Swedish left wing was scattered. However, backed up by the 4,000 peasants, the Swedes managed to escape and reorganize their left wing.

In the center the Danes took the initiative when General Russenstein attacked soon after both flanks were engaged. But as his left flank was unprotected it took a lot of beating and the Danish center slowly started dissolving. As the Swedish cavalry that had pursued the Danish left wing returned to the battle, the reorganized Swedish left wing was ready for action. And since Christian V was unable to overpower the left flank of the Swedish center, he left the field at 16:00. By 18:00 all Danish troops had quit the field and the Swedes retired to the former Danish camp.

== Aftermath ==
The reasons for the Danish defeat are said to be rivalry between Danish generals and that the Danish units had been mixed up during the night. The Danes also failed to exploit their success on the right wing, which gave the Swedes time to reorganize their units.

Though unquestionably a Swedish victory, the battle had little influence on the outcome of the war. As long as the Danes were victorious at sea and held the fortified town of Landskrona they could easily bring reinforcements to Scania. The Swedish army now counted 7,000 men, but this was not enough to take Landskrona. After a couple of skirmishes around Kristianstad, the main part of the Swedish army marched back north to Sweden proper to find winter quarters, while Christian V shipped some of his troops back to Zealand.

== See also ==
- Scanian War
- History of Scania
