= A Death-Bed =

Rudyard Kipling poem

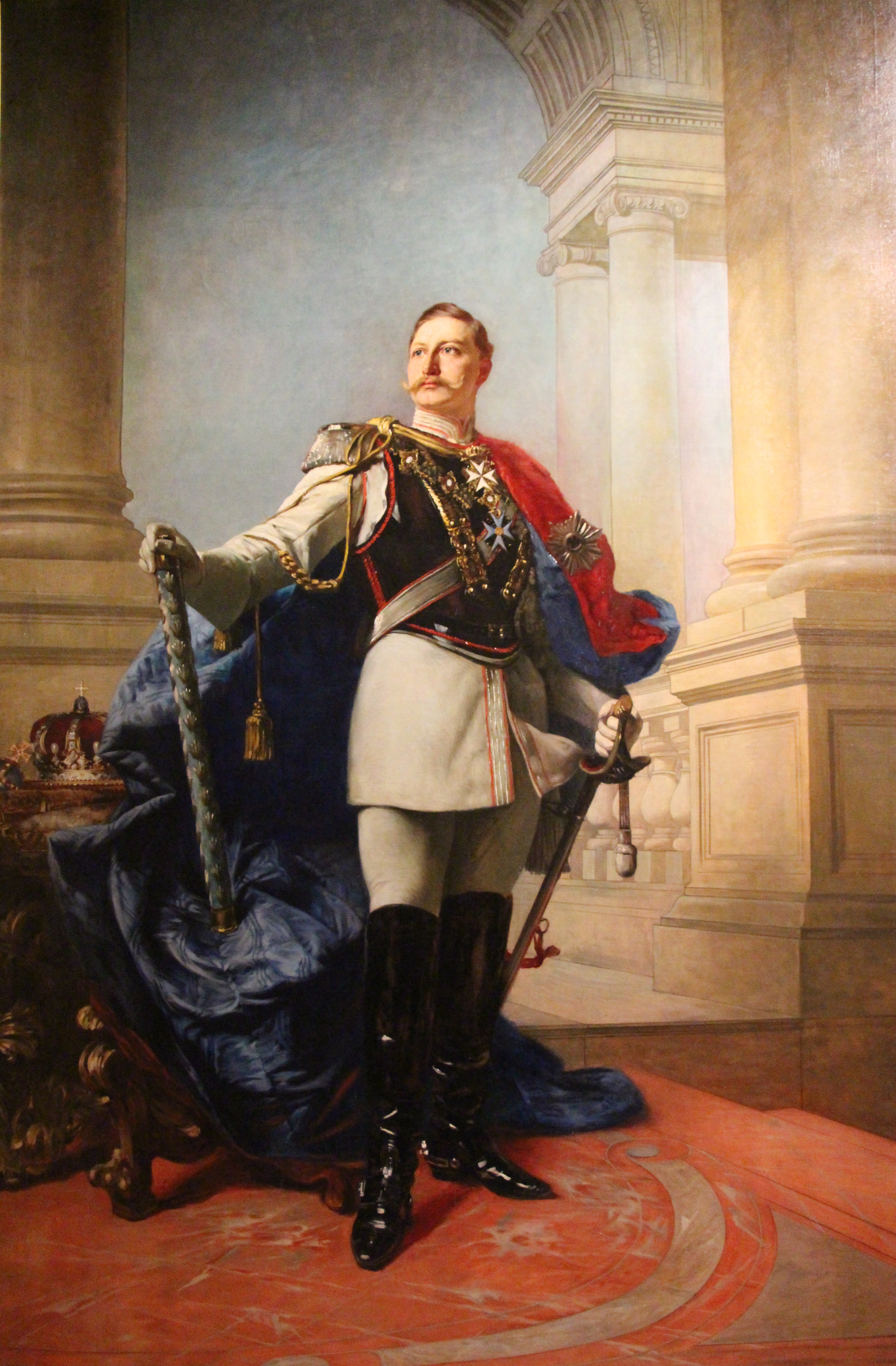
Kaiser Wilhelm II. Portrait by Max Koner

"A Death-Bed" is a poem by English poet and writer Rudyard Kipling (1865-1936). It was first published in April 1919, in the collection The Years Between. Later publications identified the year of writing as 1918. Kipling's only son, John, had been reported missing in action in 1915, during the Battle of Loos, leaving him grief-stricken. "A Death-Bed" has been variously described as "the most savage poem Kipling ever wrote", "the chilling and pitiless masterpiece" and as "overtly distasteful".

== Structure ==
"A Death-Bed" consists of 10 ABAB quatrains, with four stresses per line. It interweaves three voices:

1. In quotation marks: an absolute monarch, suffering from throat cancer.
2. In italics: a group of doctors attending the dying ruler.
3. In plain text: a commentator.

== Content ==
The dying patient vehemently asserts his absolute power, while blaming others for starting World War I. The doctors, consulting between themselves with detached professionalism, discuss his condition and recommend opiates; because it is too late for surgery. The commentator lists a succession of wartime horrors for which Imperial Germany has implied responsibility, beginning each passage with "Some die ....". Most are non-specific, but the line "Some die saintly in faith and hope— / One died thus in a prison-yard—" apparently refers to the executed British nurse Edith Cavell (1865-1915).

In the last line a doctor addresses the monarch as "All-Highest", a supposed title of the German Emperor: it is therefore Kaiser Wilhelm, who had been reported (incorrectly) to be suffering from the throat cancer which had killed his father, Kaiser Frederick. Depersonalised throughout the poem by being referred to as "this", the Kaiser dies unable to speak but begging for assurance with his eyes.
