= Älvsnabben =

Island in Sweden

Coordinates: 58.98429°N 18.18369°E

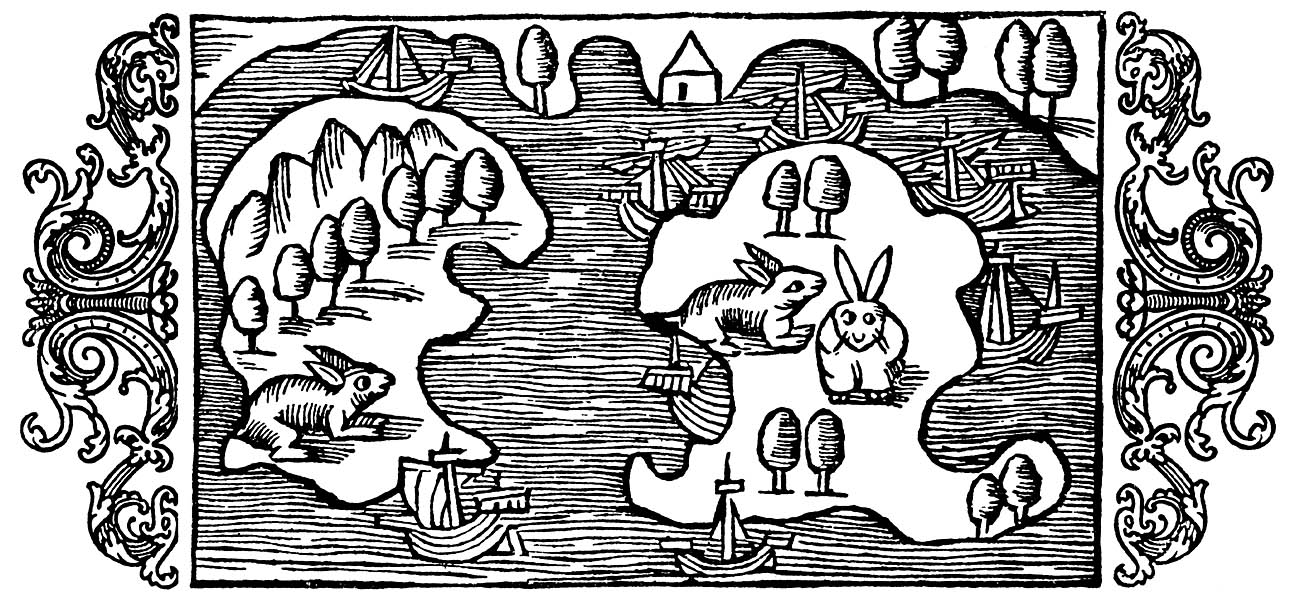
A woodcut of Älvsnabben from Historia de gentibus septentrionalibus ("A Description of the Northern Peoples") by Olaus Magnus, 1555.

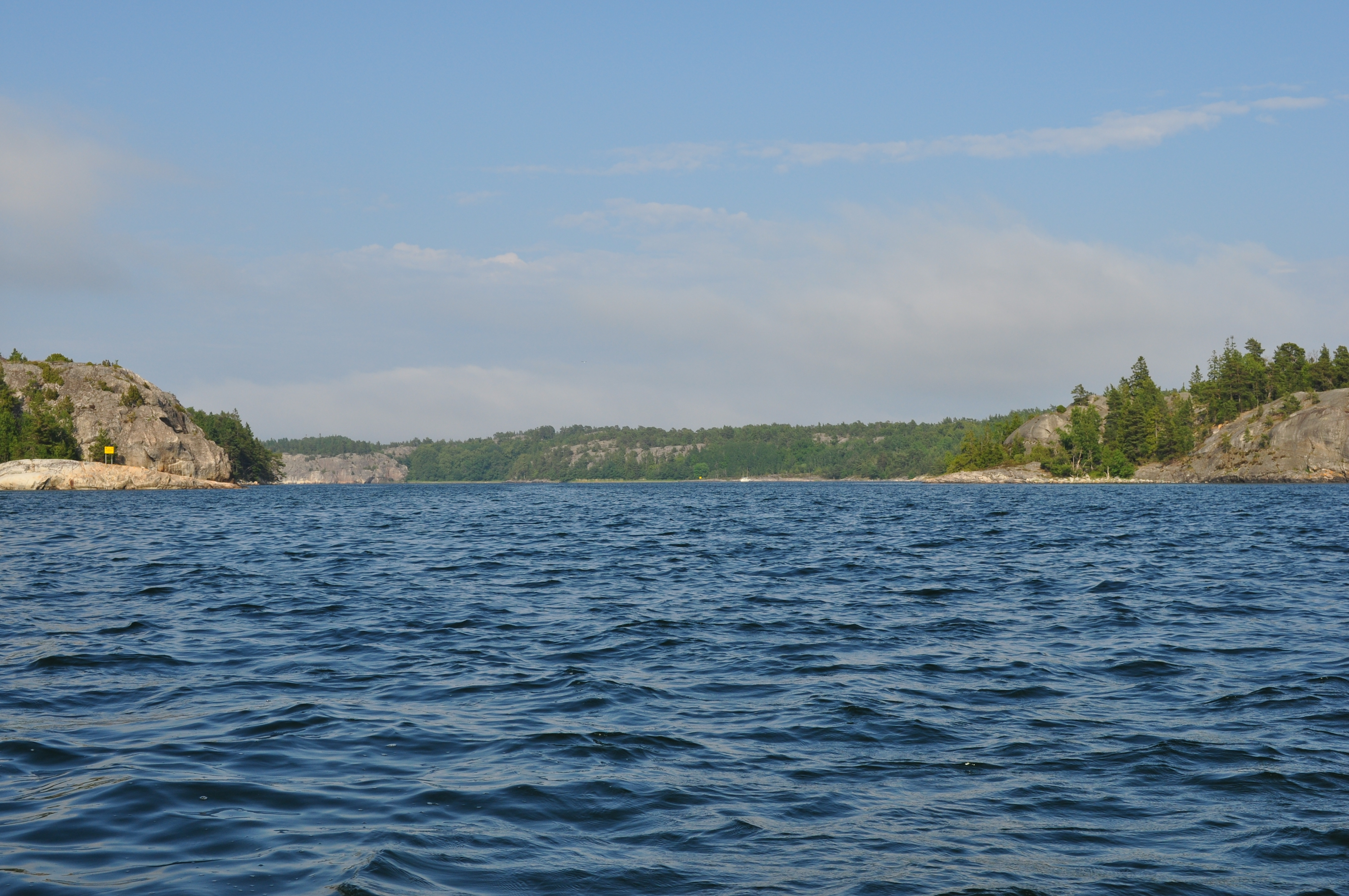
The harbour in more recent times

Älvsnabben is a small island near Muskö in the archipelago south of Stockholm, Sweden. The name may also refer to a natural harbour, more correctly called Älvsnabbsbassängen (Älvsnabben Basin), between the four small islands Älvsnabben, Bjurshagslandet, Kapellön and Gubbholmen. Älvsnabben (then Alæsnap) was mentioned as an anchoring place as early as the 13th century, then a part of a medieval sailing route, in the Danish Census Book of king Valdemar II. It was also used by the North German trade federation, the Hanseatic League, who called it Elsnaben. From the reign of king Eric XIV of Sweden, it was used as a base for the Swedish navy. As such, it is known that the Vasa was heading for the marine base on Älvsnabben when it was launched in August 1628. History tells us that the Vasa sank short after its launch, only 1200 meters from the king's castle in Stockholm.

Älvsnabben was the base of operation for the naval operations and shipping of Swedish troops to Germany during the Thirty Years War and throughout the 17th century. During the Scanian War of 1675-79, Sweden suffered a string of serious defeats against Danish and Dutch fleets, in part since Stockholm and Älvsnabben were locked in by ice in the winter and early spring. After the war, the main base of operations for the Swedish navy was moved to the newly founded Karlskrona in Blekinge in southern Sweden, which was better suited to counter the threat of the Danish fleet, Sweden's principal competition for Baltic supremacy.

In the 20th century, Älvsnabben once more came to military use by the building of the Muskö Naval Base. A shelter for navy vessels was cut in the rock of Älvsnabben, and both the island and the Älvsnabben basin is still a restricted military area.
