= Vasa syndrome =

Management and marketing problem

Vasa syndrome is a term used in both management and marketing circles referring to problems in communication and management affecting projects, sometimes causing them to fail. Its basis lies with the Swedish 17th-century warship Vasa, which sank on its maiden voyage because it was too unstable.

The disaster of the Vasa has been interpreted by management experts to have been caused by problems with communication, goal setting, and adaptability. The sinking of Vasa has also been used as an example by business managers on how to learn from previous mistakes.

== History ==
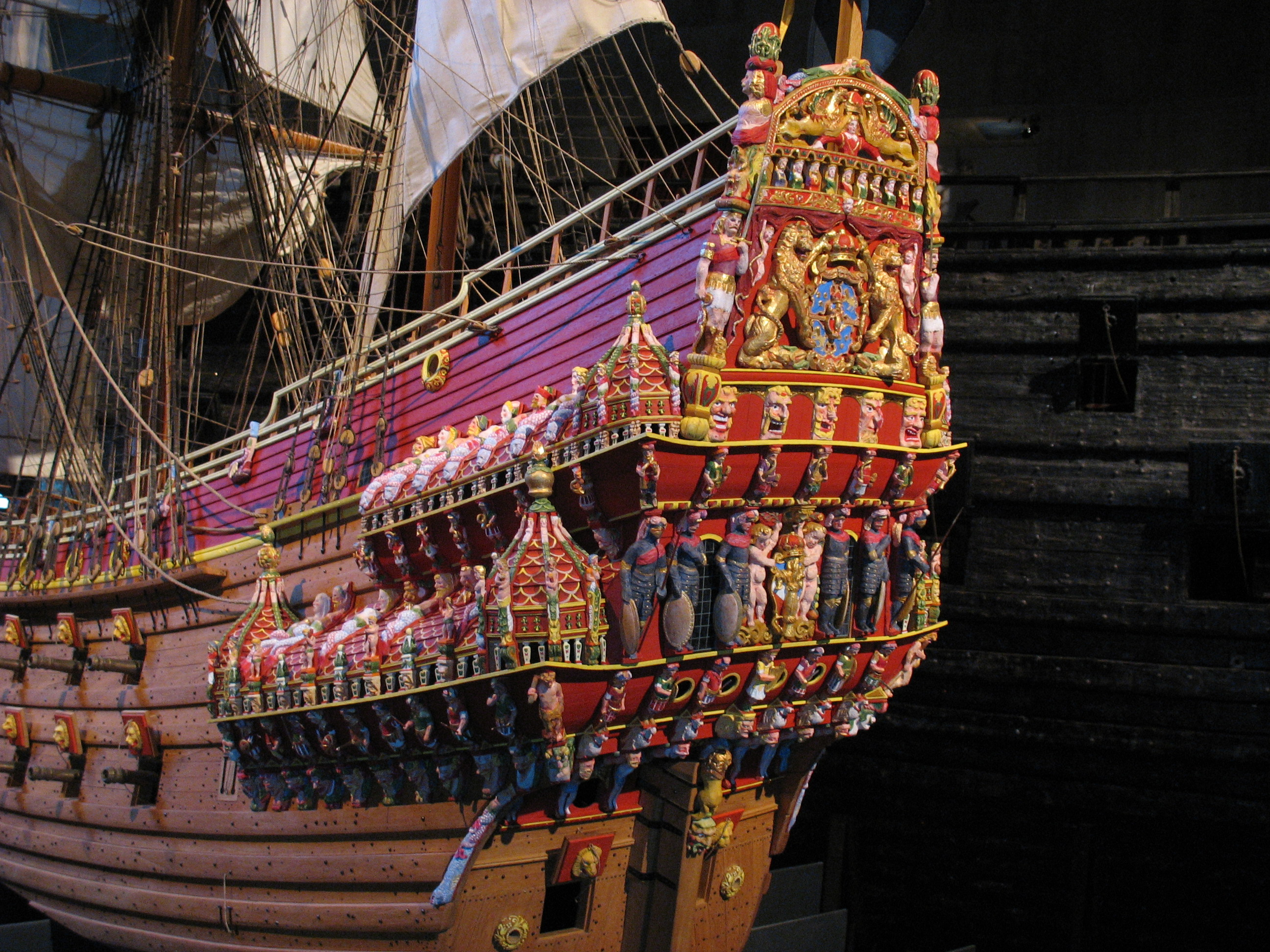
A 1:10 scale model of Vasa on display at the Vasa Museum in Stockholm. The richly decorated stern is a sign of the great prestige that contemporary warship enjoyed as symbols of power and wealth.

Vasa syndrome is inspired by the disastrous sinking of the Swedish warship Vasa on its short maiden voyage in 1628. Vasa was one of the earliest warships equipped with two full gun decks, and which was built when the theoretical principles of shipbuilding were still poorly understood. The safety margins at the time were also far below anything that would be acceptable today. Combined with the fact that 17th-century warships were built with intentionally high superstructures (to be used as firing platforms), this made Vasa a risky undertaking.

In the 1620s, Gustavus Adolphus, who was King of Sweden from 1611 to 1632, was waging war on the European continent when he commissioned the ship and insisted on swift completion of what was intended to be the pride of his fleet. Despite stability tests that showed that Vasa was dangerously unstable, she was allowed to sail in August 1628. After less than 2 km (1.2 mi), the ship was hit by a strong gust of wind and foundered in Stockholm harbor.

The fiasco of Vasa's sinking has been ascribed variously: to a supposed lengthening of the ship in mid-construction, constant meddling in minor details by the king (who was abroad waging war), and problems in communication between the various parties involved. Though today these claims are considered to have little support in contemporary sources, the idea of Vasa as a flawed project has remained, especially as she sank without ever firing a single shot.

== In relation to marketing and product innovation ==
Vasa syndrome refers to the need to stay realistic in terms of strategy and project management. Also, organizations need to keep their goals matched to their capabilities. Decision makers need to have access to unbiased information (both internal and external), and there needs to be processes in place that will allow for the flow of information throughout the organization. Internal sources allow firms to develop core competencies, while external sources enable companies to develop a wider knowledge base and to stay updated on new technologies. In light of changes such as those in customer needs; advancements or breakthroughs in technology; or changes in competition; companies may find it necessary to alter their goals. If company coordination is poor, this can make the new goals confusing, which in turn will affect product development at both the strategic and product management levels. It is important for organizations to keep their goals and objectives clear so that their new projects and activities will not be doubted by company employees.

Another problem that companies need to avoid is the desire to create a product on a shortened timeline. Although it could seem like it would be worth speeding up the innovation process to leverage first-mover advantage, "some researchers have pointed out the disadvantages of pioneering new technologies and concluded that it is sometimes better to go slower and be a follower instead of a pioneer".

There are a number of examples which demonstrate the effects of Vasa syndrome. For example, while handling the Hubble Space Telescope, NASA failed to learn from previous mistakes, and repeated many of the same mistakes in product development and project management that led to the Space Shuttle Challenger disaster. The knowledge gained from the Challenger was not stored in the organizational memory and therefore was not available to create sufficient corrective mechanisms.

Another example used to demonstrate the effect of the Vasa syndrome is Greyhound Lines's attempt to design and implement a new computerized reservation system in 1993, modeled after a similar American Airlines system. Greyhound managers did not fully understand the technology and lacked sufficient knowledge of the bus industry. Because they attempted to copy a product they did not fully understand and which ended up being quite different from what they needed, the project failed.

== See also ==
- The Dilbert principle – A more humorous take on problems with executive meddling
