= Vasa (ship) =

17th-century Swedish warship

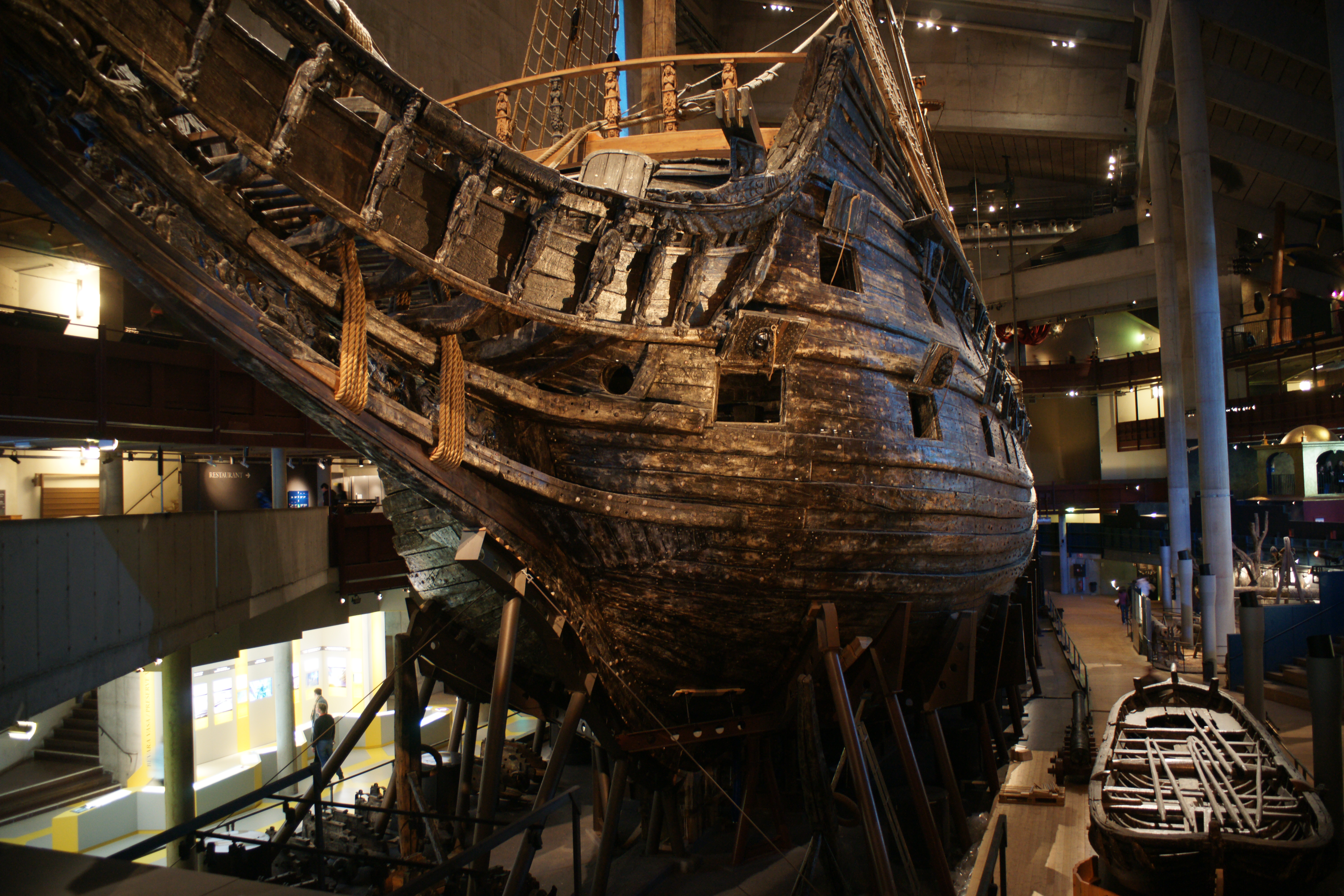
- Vasa's port bow

History

Sweden
- Builder: Skeppsgården, Stockholm
- Laid down: 1626; 400 years ago
- Launched: March 1627; 399 years ago
- Fate: Sank in 1628; 398 years ago, salvaged in 1961, became a museum ship 59°19′40″N 18°05′28″E

General characteristics
- Tonnage: 1210 tonnes displacement
- Length: Sparred length: 69 m (226 ft) (estimated); Between perpendiculars 47.5 m (156 ft)
- Beam: 11.7 m (38 ft)
- Height: 52.5 m (172 ft) from keel to mainmast truck (estimated)
- Draft: 4.8 m (16 ft)
- Propulsion: Sails, 1,275 m^{2} (13,720 sq ft)
- Crew: 145 sailors, 300 soldiers
- Armament: 64 guns, including: 24-pounders—48; 3-pounders—8; 1-pounders—2; stormstycken (howitzers)—6
- Notes: Source for dimensions & tonnage

Vasa (previously Wasa) (Swedish pronunciation: [²vɑːsa]) is a Swedish warship built between 1626 and 1628. The ship sank after sailing roughly 1,300 m (1,400 yd) into her maiden voyage on 10 August 1628. She fell into obscurity after most of her valuable bronze cannons were salvaged in the 17th century, until she was located again in the late 1950s in a busy shipping area in Stockholm harbor. The ship was salvaged with a largely intact hull in 1961 after spending 333 years on the seabed. She was housed in a temporary museum called Wasavarvet ("The Vasa Shipyard") until 1988 and then moved permanently to the Vasa Museum in the Royal National City Park in Stockholm. Between her recovery in 1961 and the beginning of 2025, Vasa has been seen by over 45 million visitors.

The ship was built on the orders of the King of Sweden Gustavus Adolphus as part of the military expansion conducted when he initiated a war with Poland-Lithuania (1626–1629). She was constructed at the navy yard in Stockholm under a contract with private entrepreneurs in 1626–1627 and armed primarily with bronze cannons cast in Stockholm specifically for the ship. Richly decorated as a symbol of the king's ambitions for Sweden and himself, upon completion she was one of the most powerfully armed vessels in the world. However, Vasa was dangerously unstable, with too much weight in the upper structure of the hull. Despite this lack of stability, she was ordered to sea and sank only a few minutes after encountering a wind stronger than a breeze.

The order to sail was the result of a combination of factors. The king, who was leading the army in Poland at the time of her maiden voyage, was impatient to see her take up her station as flagship of the reserve squadron at Älvsnabben in the Stockholm Archipelago. At the same time the king's subordinates lacked the political courage to openly discuss the ship's problems or to have the maiden voyage postponed. An inquiry was organized by the Swedish Privy Council to find those responsible for the disaster, but in the end no one was punished.

During the 1961 recovery, thousands of artifacts and the remains of at least 15 people were found in and around Vasa's hull by marine archaeologists. Among the many items found were clothing, weapons, cannons, tools, coins, cutlery, food, drink and six of the ten sails. The artifacts and the ship herself have provided scholars with invaluable insights into details of naval warfare, shipbuilding techniques, the evolution of sailing rigs, and everyday life in early 17th-century Sweden. Today Vasa is the world's best-preserved 17th-century ship, answering many questions about the design and operation of ships of this period. The wreck of Vasa continually undergoes monitoring and further research on how to preserve her.

== Historical background ==
A map of Sweden's territorial gains and losses 1560–1815. In the years that Vasa was built and sank, Sweden still had not seized the southernmost of its present provinces, but possessed almost all of modern-day Finland and Estonia as well as Ingria and Karelia.

During the 17th century, Sweden went from being a sparsely populated, poor, and peripheral northern European kingdom of little influence to one of the major powers in continental politics. Between 1611 and 1718 it was the dominant power in the Baltic, eventually gaining territory that encompassed the Baltic on all sides. This rise to prominence in international affairs and increase in military prowess, called stormaktstiden ("age of greatness" or "great power period"), was made possible by a succession of able monarchs and the establishment of a powerful centralized government, supporting a highly efficient military organization. Swedish historians have described this as one of the more extreme examples of an early modern state using almost all of its available resources to wage war; the small northern kingdom transformed itself into a fiscal-military state and one of the most militarized states in history.

Gustavus Adolphus (1594–1632) has been considered one of the most successful Swedish kings in terms of success in warfare. When Vasa was built, he had been in power for more than a decade. Sweden was embroiled in a war with Poland-Lithuania, and looked apprehensively at the development of the Thirty Years' War in present-day Germany. The war had been raging since 1618 and from a Protestant perspective it was not successful. The king's plans for a Polish campaign and for securing Sweden's interests required a strong naval presence in the Baltic.

The Swedish Navy suffered several severe setbacks during the 1620s. In 1625, a squadron cruising in the Bay of Riga was caught in a storm and ten ships ran aground and were wrecked. In the Battle of Oliwa in 1627, a Swedish squadron was outmaneuvered and defeated by a Polish force and two large ships were lost. Tigern ("The Tiger"), which was the Swedish admiral's flagship, was captured by the Poles, and Solen ("The Sun") was blown up by her own crew when she was boarded and nearly captured. In 1628, three more large ships were lost in less than a month. Admiral Klas Fleming's flagship Kristina was wrecked in a storm in the Gulf of Danzig, Riksnyckeln ("Key of the Realm") ran aground at Viksten in the southern archipelago of Stockholm and Vasa foundered on her maiden voyage.

Gustavus Adolphus was engaged in naval warfare on several fronts, which further exacerbated the difficulties of the navy. In addition to battling the Polish navy, the Swedes were indirectly threatened by Imperial forces that had invaded Jutland. The Swedish king had little sympathy for the Danish king, Christian IV, and Denmark and Sweden had been bitter enemies for well over a century. However, Sweden feared a Catholic conquest of Copenhagen and Zealand. This would have granted the Catholic powers control over the strategic passages between the Baltic Sea and the North Sea, which would be disastrous for Swedish interests.

Until the early 17th century, the Swedish navy was composed primarily of small to medium-sized ships with a single gundeck, normally armed with 12-pounder and smaller guns; these ships were cheaper than larger ships and were well-suited for escort and patrol. They also suited the prevailing tactical thinking within the navy, which emphasized boarding as the decisive moment in a naval battle rather than gunnery. The king, who was a keen artillerist, saw the potential of ships as gun platforms, and large, heavily armed ships made a more dramatic statement in the political theater of naval power. Beginning with Vasa, he ordered a series of ships with two full gundecks, outfitted with much heavier guns.

Four such ships were built after Vasa: Äpplet ("The Apple" (Note: The Swedish term for the globus cruciger, the regal orb and cross, is äpple or riksäpple, literally "apple (of the realm)".)), Kronan ("The Crown"), Scepter and Göta Ark (literally "Ark of Götaland"), before the Privy Council cancelled the orders for the others after the king's death in 1632. These ships, especially Kronan and Scepter, were much more successful, took part in battles, and served as flagships in the Swedish navy until the 1660s. The second of the so-called regalskepp (usually translated as "royal ships"), (Note: Vasa was actually never referred to as a regalskepp before she was lost, but was classified as one afterwards;) Äpplet was completed in 1629 and is regarded as a sister ship of Vasa. The only significant difference between the two was an increase in the width of Äpplet by about a meter (3.1 ft). The wreck of Äpplet, visibly very similar to Vasa, was found in December 2021. Äpplet, and other ships, are believed ultimately to have been decommissioned and sunk as underwater barriers against enemy ships.

== Name ==
The name Vasa is not written anywhere on the ship. The stern is adorned with a substantial carving of the coat of arms of the House of Vasa. The central heraldic symbol of that is the "vase" which, at the time the ship was built, denoted a sheaf of wheat (or wheatsheaf). It is this main heraldic element that gives the ship her name.

In contemporary documents, the name was most often spelt as "Wasen" or "Wasan". Swedish spelling was rationalised early in the 20th century and one of these changes was the substitution of the "W" with a "V". The pronunciation is unchanged. In Swedish, the definite article is the suffix "-(e)n" or "-(e)t", depending on grammatical gender of the noun: "the Vasa". The decision of the Vasamuseet was to follow the usage for warship names in English, which is to have no definite article.

The word "Vasa" was used in the names of at least seven Swedish warships, two built before this ship (c. 1570 and 1599) and four after, with the most recent built in 1902.

== Construction ==
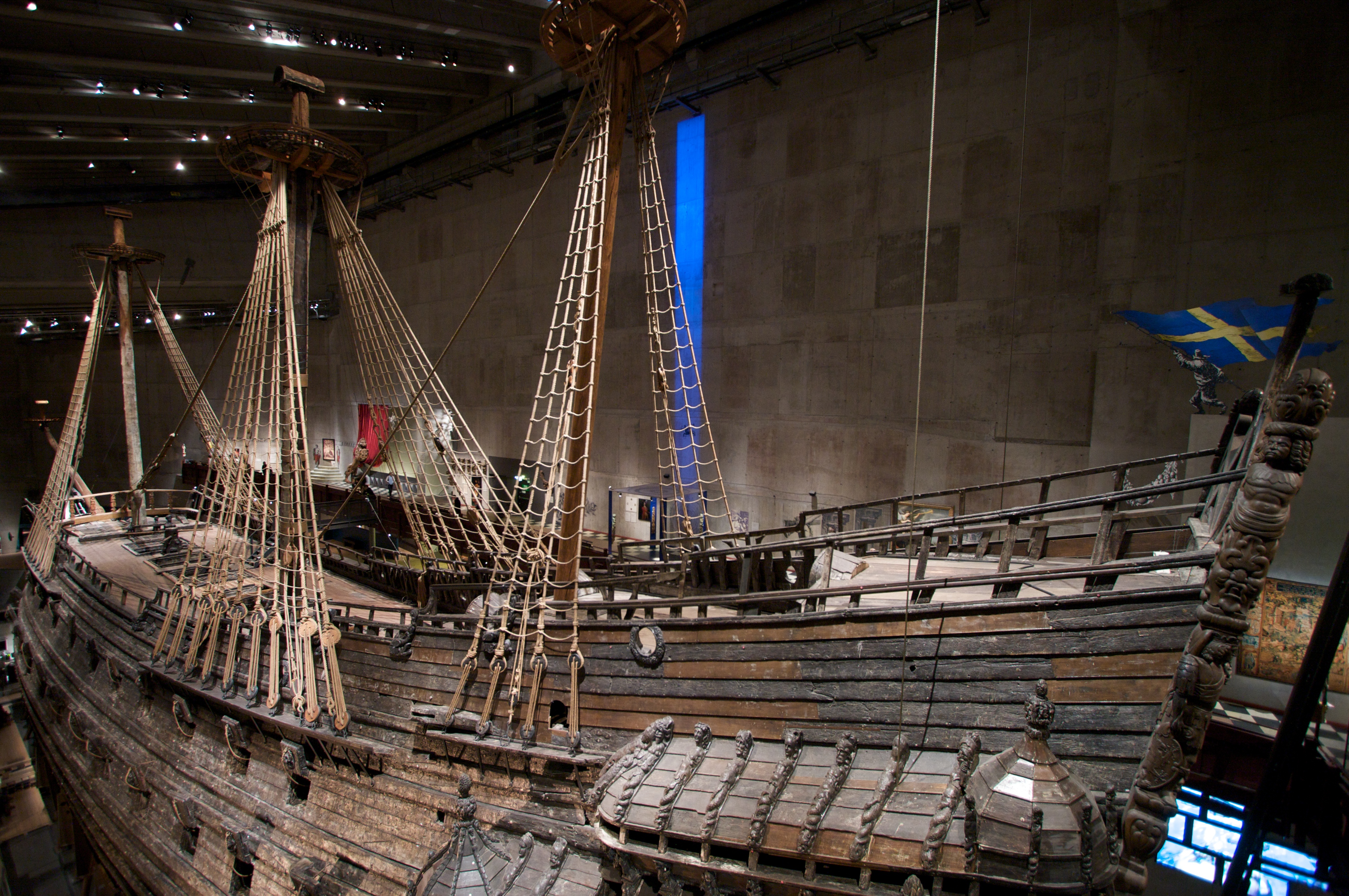
Vasa's port side

When Vasa was ordered, Dutch-born Henrik Hybertsson ("Master Henrik") was shipwright at the Stockholm shipyard. On 16 January 1625, Master Henrik and business partner Arendt de Groote signed a contract to build four ships, two with a keel of around 135 feet (41 m) and two smaller ones of 108 feet (33 m).

Master Henrik and Arendt de Groote began buying the raw materials needed for the first ships in 1625, purchasing timber from individual estates in Sweden as well as buying rough-sawn planking in Riga, Königsberg (modern Kaliningrad), and Amsterdam. As they prepared to begin the first of the new ships in the autumn of 1625, Henrik corresponded with the king through Vice Admiral Klas Fleming about which ship to build first. The loss of ten ships in the Bay of Riga led the king to propose building two ships of a new, medium size as a quick compromise, and he sent a specification for this, a ship which would be 120 feet (37 m) long on the keel. Henrik declined, since he had already cut the timber for a large and a small ship. He laid the keel for a larger ship in late February or early March 1626. Master Henrik never saw Vasa completed; he fell ill in late 1625, and by the summer of 1626 he had handed over supervision of the work in the yard to another Dutch shipwright, Henrik "Hein" Jacobsson. He died in the spring of 1627, probably about the same time as the ship was launched. After launching, work continued on finishing the upper deck, the sterncastle, the beakhead and the rigging. Sweden had still not developed a sizeable sailcloth industry, and material had to be ordered from abroad. In the contract for the maintenance of rigging, French sailcloth was specified, but the cloth for the sails of Vasa most likely came from Holland. The sails were made mostly of hemp and partly of flax. The rigging was made entirely of hemp imported from Latvia through Riga. The king visited the shipyard in January 1628 and made what was probably his only visit aboard the ship.

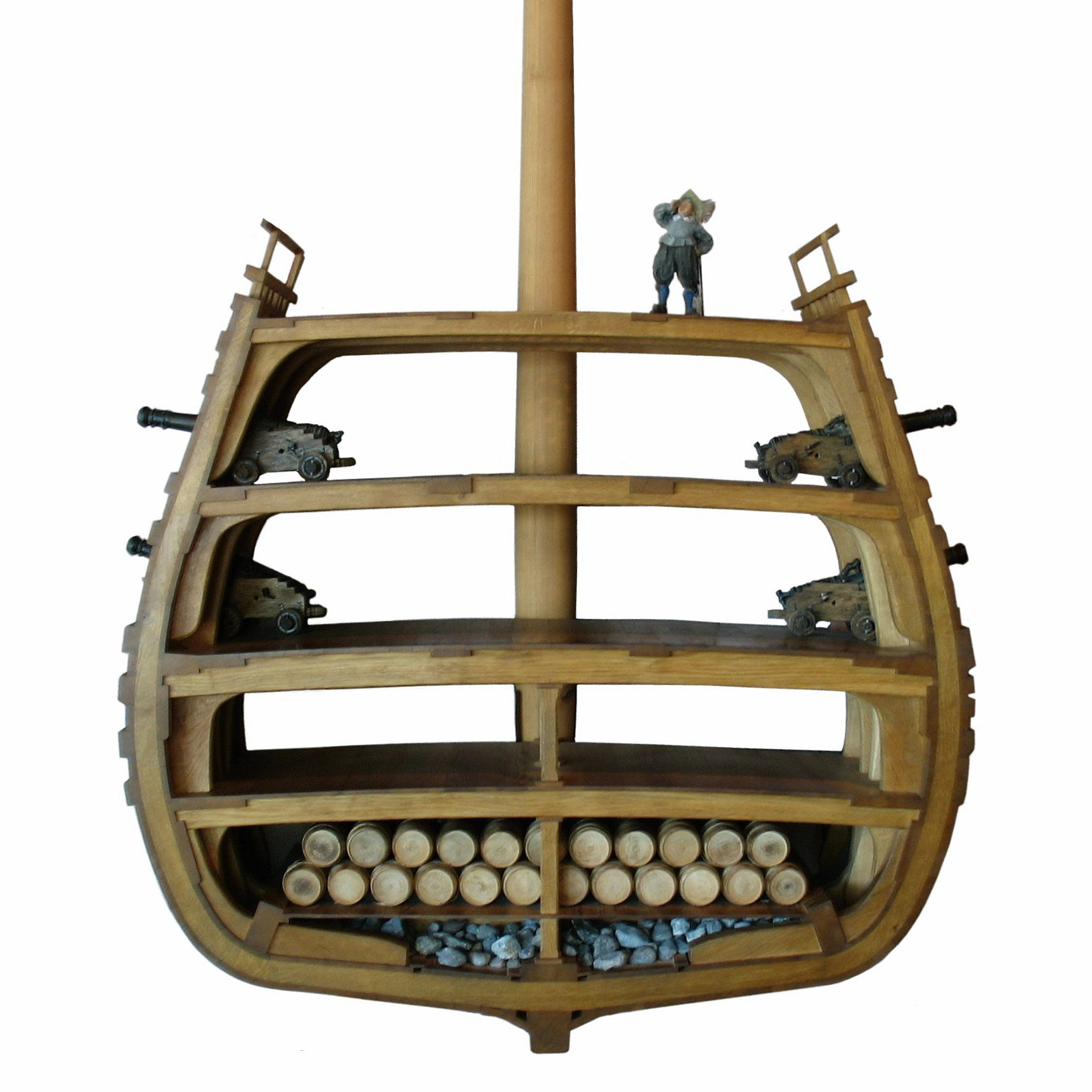
A model showing a cross section of Vasa's hull, illustrating the shallow hold and two gundecks

In the summer of 1628, the captain responsible for supervising construction of the ship, Söfring Hansson, arranged for the ship's stability to be demonstrated for Vice Admiral Fleming, who had recently arrived in Stockholm from Prussia. Thirty men ran back and forth across the upper deck to start the ship rolling, but the admiral stopped the test after they had made only three trips, as he feared the ship would capsize. According to testimony by the ship's master, Göran Mattson, Fleming remarked that he wished the king were at home. Gustavus Adolphus had been sending a steady stream of letters insisting that the ship be put to sea as soon as possible.

=== Design and stability ===
There has been much speculation about whether Vasa was lengthened during construction and whether an additional gundeck was added late during the build. There is no evidence that Vasa was substantially modified after the keel was laid. Ships contemporary to Vasa that were elongated were cut in half and new timbers spliced between the existing sections, making the addition readily identifiable, but no such addition can be identified in the hull, nor is there any evidence for any late additions of a second gundeck.

The king ordered seventy-two 24-pound guns for the ship on 5 August 1626, and this was too many to fit on a single gundeck. Since the king's order was issued less than five months after construction started, it would have come early enough for the second deck to be included in the design. The French Galion du Guise, the ship used as a model for Vasa, according to Arendt de Groote, also had two gundecks. Laser measurements of Vasa's structure conducted in 2007–2011 confirmed that no major changes were implemented during construction, but that the centre of gravity was too high.

There was some vacillation over the exact armament for Vasa whilst she was being built. One issue was trying to source enough guns to meet the specification. The major options were a lower gun-deck battery of 24-pounders, with the upper gun-deck being 12-pounders – versus having just 24-pounders on both the gun-decks. Vasa was actually built with upper gun-deck ports sized for the smaller 12-pounders. The final decision, though, was a total of 56 24-pounders distributed over the two gun-decks. Not all of these guns had been delivered by the time she sailed; some gun carriages remained empty.

Vasa was an early example of a warship with two full-length gundecks, and was built when the theoretical principles of shipbuilding were still poorly understood. Two gundecks was a much more complicated compromise between seaworthiness and firepower than a single gundeck. The overall weight distribution, particularly the hull itself, was too top-heavy. This underlying fault was not possible to correct by adding more ballast, and might have required a major redesign to correct. Safety margins during the 17th century were also far below anything that would be acceptable today. Combined with the fact that 17th-century warships were built with intentionally high superstructures, used as firing platforms, this made Vasa a risky undertaking.

=== Armament ===
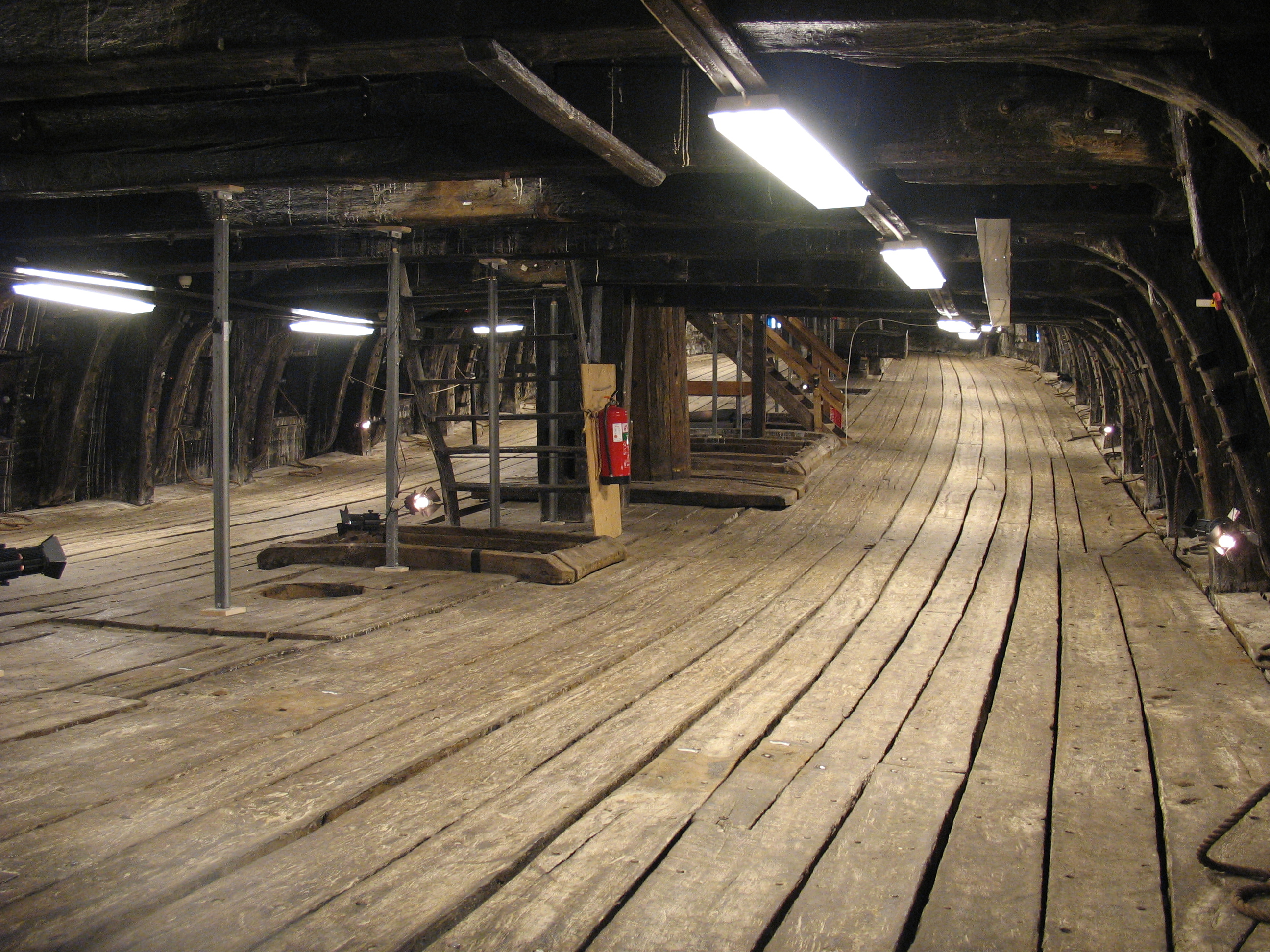
The inside of the lower gundeck looking toward the bow. The interior of the ship does not contain any guns or any of the original contents and is currently fitted with modern lighting and other safety features.

Vasa was built during a time of transition in naval tactics, from an era when boarding was still one of the primary ways of fighting enemy ships to an era of the strictly organized ship-of-the-line and a focus on victory through superior gunnery. Vasa was armed with powerful guns and built with a high stern, which would act as a firing platform in boarding actions for some of the 300 soldiers she was supposed to carry, but the high-sided hull and narrow upper deck were not optimized for boarding. She was neither the largest ship ever built, nor the one carrying the greatest number of guns. What made her arguably the most powerful warship of the time was the combined weight of shot that could be fired from the cannons of one side: 588 pounds (267 kg), excluding stormstycken, guns used for firing anti-personnel ammunition instead of solid shot. This was the largest concentration of artillery in a single warship in the Baltic at the time, perhaps in all of northern Europe, and it was not until the 1630s that a ship with more firepower was built. This large amount of naval artillery was placed on a ship that was quite small relative to the armament carried. By comparison, USS Constitution, a frigate built by the United States 169 years after Vasa, had roughly the same firepower, but was over 700 tonnes (690 long tons; 770 short tons) heavier.

The Constitution, however, belonged to a later era of naval warfare that employed the line of battle tactic, where ships fought in a line of ships (or line ahead) attempting to present the batteries of one side of each ship toward the enemy. The guns would be aimed in the same direction, and fire could be concentrated on a single target. In the 17th century, tactics involving organized formations of large fleets had still not been developed. Rather, ships would fight individually or in small improvised groups, and focused on boarding. Vasa, though possessing a formidable battery, was built with these tactics in mind, and therefore lacked a unified broadside with guns that were all aimed in roughly the same direction. Rather, the guns were intended to be fired independently and were arranged according to the curvature of the hull, so that the ship bristled with artillery in all directions, covering virtually all angles. The guns facing aft, the stern chasers, were still not on board when the ship sank, however.

Naval gunnery in the 17th century was still in its infancy. Guns were expensive and had a much longer lifespan than any warship. Guns with a lifetime of over a century were not unheard of, while most warships would be used for only 15 to 20 years. In Sweden and many other European countries, a ship would normally not "own" her guns, but would be issued armament from the armory for every campaign season. Ships were therefore usually fitted with guns of very diverse age and size. What allowed Vasa to carry so much firepower was not merely that an unusually large number of guns were crammed into a relatively small ship, but also that the 46 main 24-pounder guns were of a new and standardized lightweight design. These were cast in a single series at the state gun foundry in Stockholm, under the direction of the Swiss-born founder Medardus Gessus. Two additional 24-pounders, of a heavier and older design, were mounted in the bows as bow chasers. Four more heavy guns were intended for the stern, but the cannon foundry could not cast guns as fast as the navy yard could build ships, and Vasa waited nearly a year after construction was finished for her armament. When the ship sailed in August 1628, eight of the planned armament of 72 guns had still not been delivered. All cannons during this time had to be made from individually made moulds that could not be reused, but Vasa's guns had such uniform precision in their manufacturing that their primary dimensions varied by only a few millimeters, and their bores were almost exactly 146 mm (5.7 in). The remaining armament of Vasa consisted of eight 3-pounders, six large-caliber stormstycken (similar to what the English called howitzers) for use during boarding actions, and two 1-pound falconets. Also included on board were 894 kilograms (1,971 pounds) of gunpowder and over 1,000 shot of various types for the guns.

The gundecks of Vasa are not parallel to the waterline, but follow the natural sheerline of the hull; this curve can be clearly seen in some of the photographs taken inside the ship. By the middle of the 17th century, warships had the gundeck set parallel to the waterline. Vasa's arrangement avoids any of the gunports having to be cut through the structural wales, which also follow this curve. The later layout means that the lower gundeck gunports are a consistent amount above the waterline, avoiding the weight of guns and structure of that deck towards the bow and stern being unnecessarily high.

=== Construction method ===
The bottom of Vasa's hull was built using the Dutch bottom-based method of construction (also referred to as the "Dutch flush" method). This differs from both carvel and clinker construction, though the finished appearance is that of the former, and the philosophy of the method is that of the latter. The start of the building process was the setting up of the keel, and the stem and stern post. Then, before any of the floors (Note: The frames in a hull are the transverse structural components. A single frame is usually made of several pieces. The piece above the keel, extending across the width of the bottom of the hull is the "floor". The next piece is the "futtock", which overlaps the end of the floor and carries the frame structure up the side of the ship – several futtocks are usually needed to go from the end of the floor to deck level.) were installed, the planking of the bottom of the hull was shaped and fitted. The planks were assembled edge to edge (as in carvel), but at this stage of construction, there was no hull skeleton to dictate the shape of the hull (in contrast to carvel). Planks were held together with temporary cleats that were nailed to them. The plank shape determined the hull shape, in this region of the hull, so making this a "shell-first" construction method, like clinker, as opposed to "skeleton-first" (alternatively "frame-first or "frame-led" (Note: "Frame-first" usually implies that the entire hull framework is erected and then planking begins. "Frame-led" is where some frame elements (floors or futtocks) are installed and then planked. Then the futtocks are installed for the next level, which is then planked. Therefore alternating phases of frame and plank installation are carried out.)).

Once the bottom of the hull planking was completed, the floors were shaped and fitted. Then the first futtocks were installed, and planking continued up the side of the hull in a normal frame-led carvel method.

This construction method can be identified in Vasa from the nail holes for the temporary cleats that held the bottom planks in position until the floors were fitted. The holes are filled with wooden plugs.

The same bottom-based construction method was used for at least some of the medieval cogs that have been investigated. It is also argued that this construction technique goes back to Romano-Celtic ships in Northern Europe in the early centuries AD.

The significance of this method for Vasa is that the Dutch bottom-based system, as far as is known, did not involve plans put down on paper. European shipbuilders were still developing methods of recording the intended and actual shape of a hull. By the time that French and English shipyards took over from the Dutch as Europe's major shipbuilders (c. 1700), the use of paper plans and hull models had become common.

=== Sailing rig ===
Generally, masts, sails and rigging, if not lost in the original wrecking event, are much more exposed to contemporary salvage, degradation or loss than the lower hull components that usually make up the remains of wrecks. With Vasa, virtually all of the lower fore and main masts have survived, much of the bowsprit and two yards which are likely derived from the ship. To this are added the six sails (out of a complement of ten) that were not set on the maiden voyage, but stored below in the sailroom, the 412 gun tackle and rigging blocks (plus 143 pieces) recovered out of a possible outfit of about 600, the deadeyes used to adjust the tension in the shrouds, of which 125 were recovered, parrel ribs and trucks, and ropes. By comparison, the Red Bay wreck 24M (sunk, probably, 1565) yielded 48 standing blocks (equivalent to deadeyes) and 24 running blocks whilst the Mary Rose (sunk 1545) produced only blocks that were stored below decks – and the recovered sail has yet to be investigated. Neither of these had surviving masts, with their size only being estimated from the dimensions of the mast partners and steps. Vasa's sailing rig finds easily outnumber the aggregate total of finds from these two wrecks plus those from La Belle (sunk 1686) and Santo Antonio de Tanna (sunk 1697).

==== Masts and yards ====
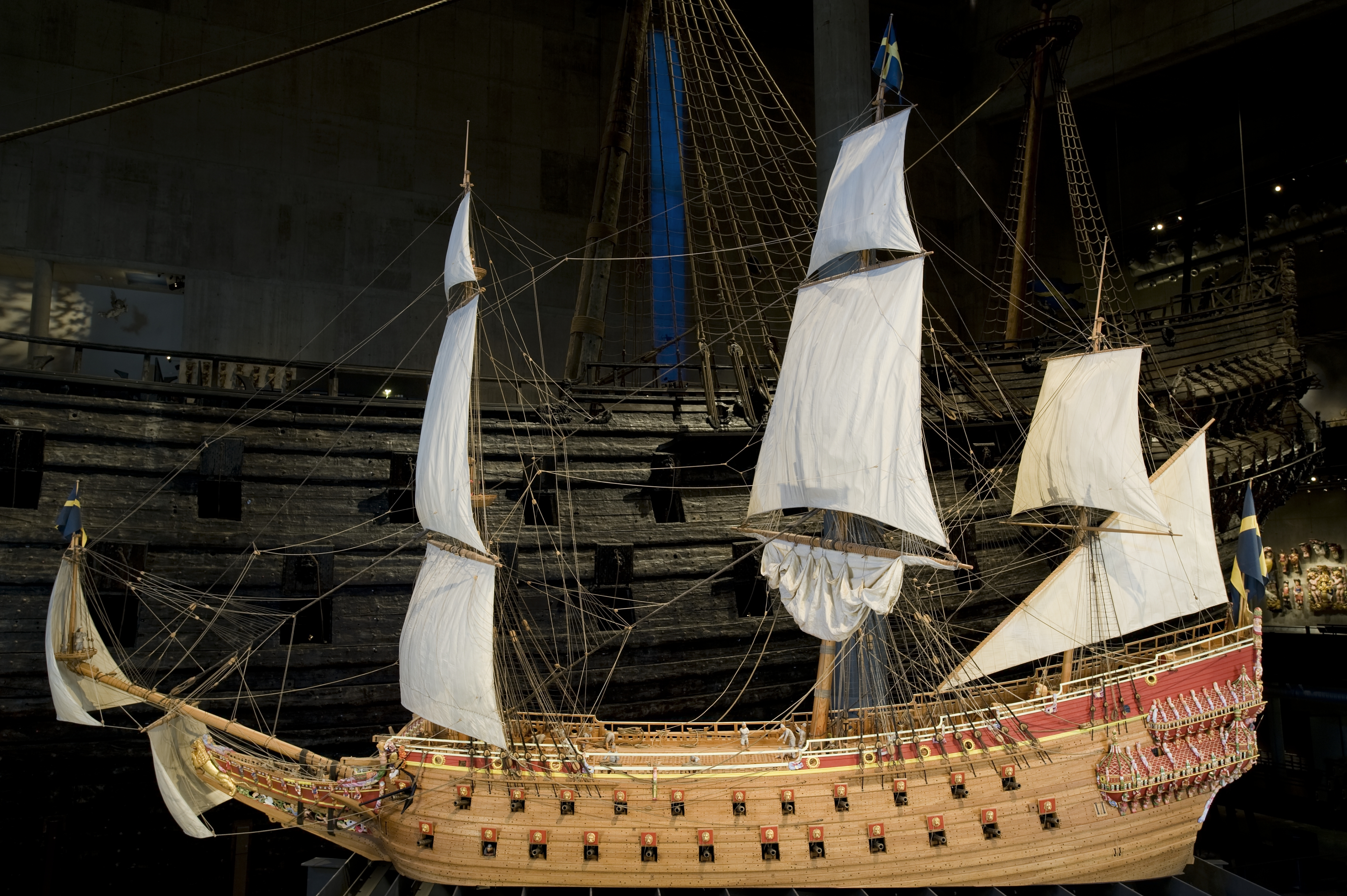
A 1:10 rigged model of Vasa

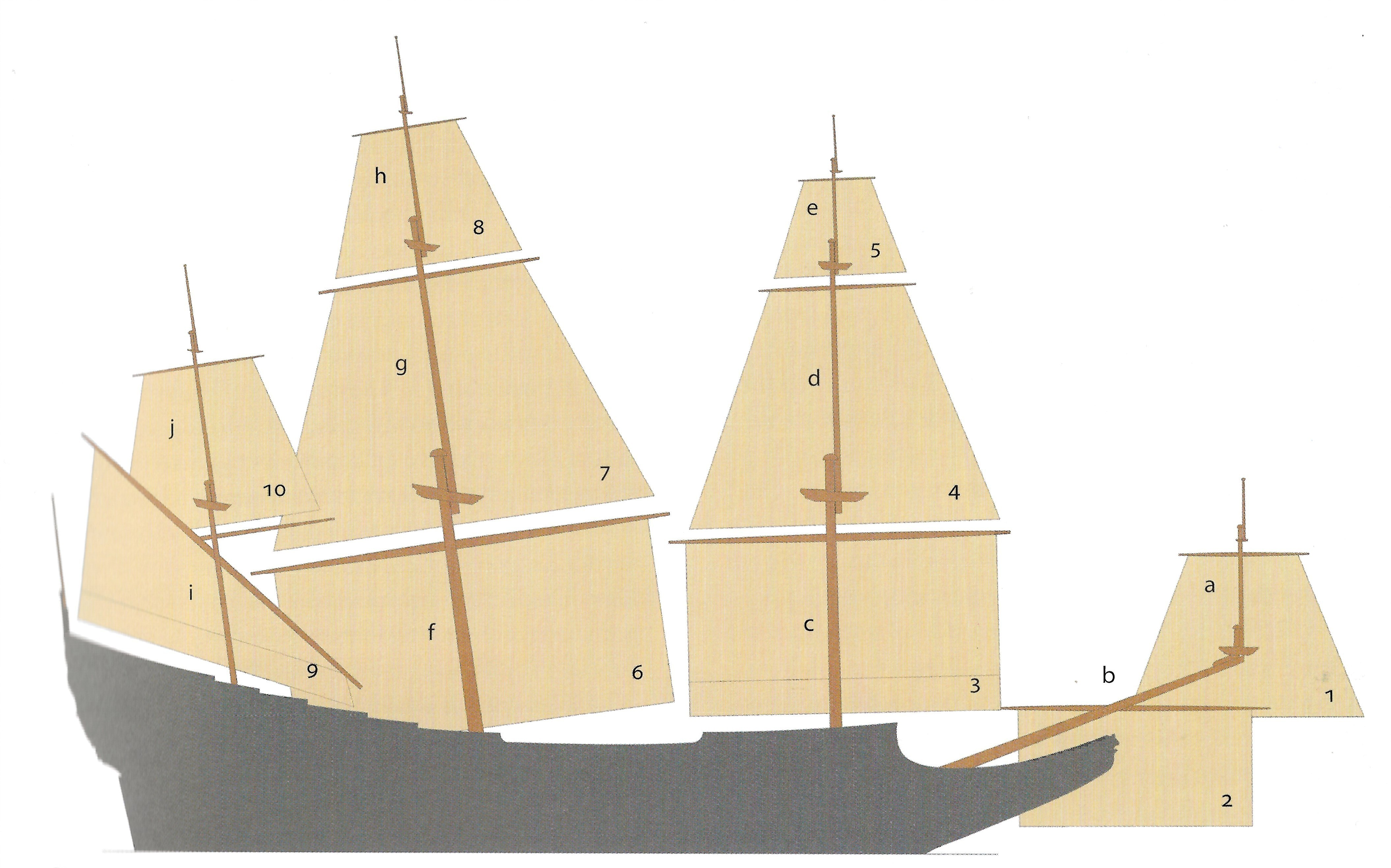
Sails: 1. spritsail topsail; 2. spritsail; 3. fore course; 4. fore topsail; 5. fore topgallant sail; 6. main course; 7. main topsail; 8. main topgallant sail; 9. mizzen; 10. mizzen topsail.; Masts and spars: 1. spritsail topmast; 2. bowsprit; 3. foremast; 4. fore topmast; 5. fore topgallant mast; 6. mainmast; 7. main topmast; 8. main topgallant mast; 9. mizzenmast; 10. mizzen topmast

Vasa had three masts: a foremast towards the bow of the ship, a mainmast near the middle and a mizzen mast in the after part of the ship. The fore- and mainmasts were built in three sections: a lower mast that was stepped on the stem and keel at the bottom of the ship's hull and passed through each of the decks; a topmast that was attached to the lower section; and a topgallant mast at the top. The topmasts and topgallants were salvaged soon after the sinking, while most of the lower sections of the main and foremasts largely survived to be salvaged in modern times. The mizzen mast consisted of only two sections: a mizzen, which was stepped on the upper gundeck, followed by a mizzen topmast. The bowsprit was stepped against the front of the lower foremast through the bowsprit bitts, a heavy timber frame located on the upper gundeck. The bowsprit served as a point of attachment for several of the major stays that held up much of the standing rig. At the outer end of the bowsprit there was a spritsail topmast with a mast head to carry a flagstaff.

The lower foremast was made from a single pine tree with additional material to make the cheeks and the hounds that were used to attach the stays. The lower mainmast was assembled as a "made mast" from a number of pieces of timber that reinforced a central core, rather than from a single tree. A single-tree mast was the preferred choice at the time and was much stronger structurally. The shipyard in Stockholm had at least indirect access to timber from western Sweden at the time. "Gothenburg masts" were considered among the best in Europe, but this source was not fully utilized by the Swedish navy until later in the 17th century. The made mast used for Vasa was most likely supplied by Amsterdam-based merchants who dominated the European timber market at the time.

==== Sails ====
When Vasa sank, she only had four of her complement of ten sails bent onto the yards. The others were below deck in the sail room, neatly folded, tied and coiled, and placed in two large heaps. The weight of this mound of canvas presented problems to the excavators, but it probably contributed substantially to the survival of the sail cloth, which fared better towards the centre of the heaps. When excavated, the larger heap had to be carefully cut into two pieces so that it could be manoeuvred out of the sail room. (Note: The mounds of sail cloth were moved by driving metal sheets underneath each heap and then dragging each sheet out of the sail room and under a hatch. From here, they could be lifted out of the ship and sent for conservation.)

The recovered sails consisted of the spritsail, spritsail topsail, fore topgallant, main course, main topgallant and the mizzen topsail. There was also a bonnet for the mizzen and a set of sails for a ship's boat (a staysail and a mainsail (Note: As a potential source of confusion, the ship's boat's mainsail is a spritsail – the fore-and-aft sail with this name. This is different from the square sail, also called a spritsail, which was set from the bowsprit of Vasa)). The sails are of relatively light construction when compared to those of ships from later times. This fits with the Swedish navy in the 1620s operating generally only in the summer months when strong winds would not be expected. Two weights of canvas are used. The main course, mizzen bonnet and spritsail used the heavier one, which consisted of plain woven hemp. The lighter type of canvas was made of a mixture of flax and hemp, and used on the other recovered sails. Hemp is the stronger of the two fibres used.

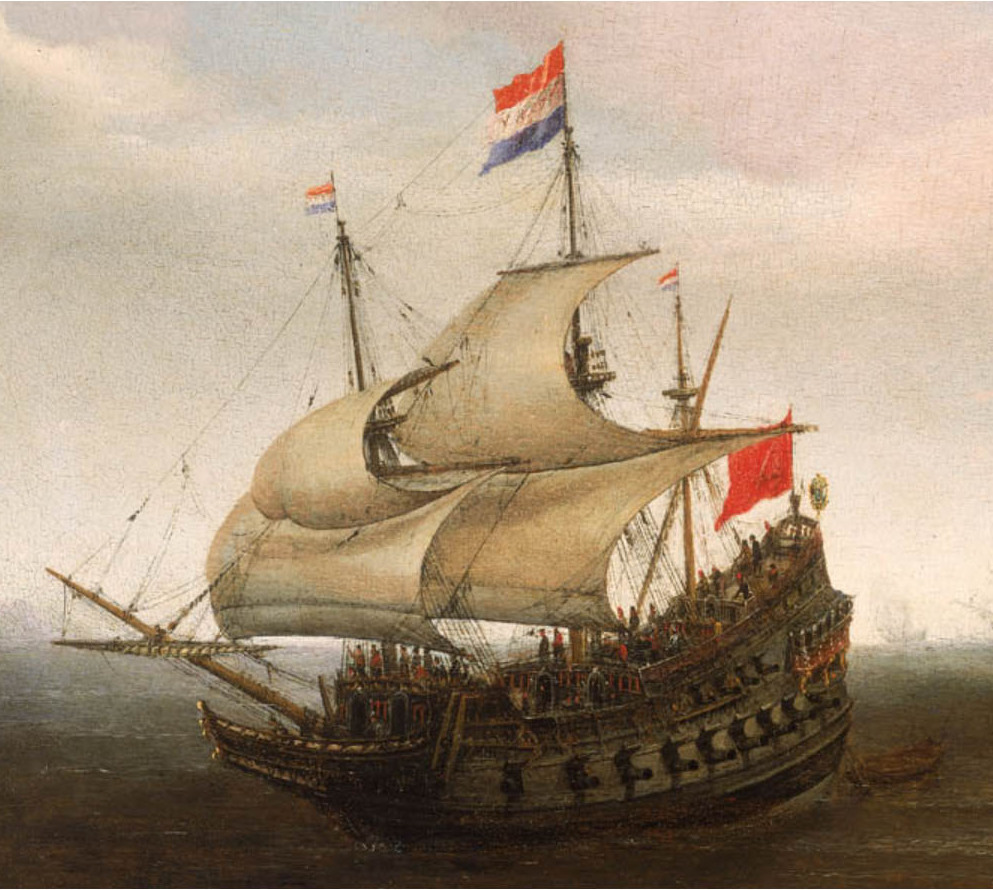
A painting of the same date as Vasa, showing the "half-masting" of the topsails as a response to stronger winds

Square sails of ships from the time of Vasa were not reefed to reduce the amount of sail area in strong winds. An extra piece of sail, called a bonnet was instead fastened to the foot (lower edge) of the fore course in lighter winds. (Note: A bonnet could have been fitted to the main course, though this was not usually done and the main course has no provision for one to be fitted in Vasa. As noted above, Vasa's mizzen did have a bonnet.) In stronger winds, instead of reefing, the bonnet was removed. Another action in stronger winds was to "half mast" the topsails. This involved partially lowering the topsails, which reduced the amount of drive they produced. With the sail lower down the topmast, the forces generated were lower down the mast, so putting less tension in the backstays. (Note: This method of operating this version of square rig has been demonstrated in the replica of Duyfken, with the technique based on, among other things, extensive research of the paintings of ships from this era. The term "half mast" is used by John Narborough, his precise usage being, for example: "it blew so hard that we could not carry out our lower tier of guns, nor our topsails above half mast up.") In contrast, the ship's boat sails recovered from the sail room carried reef points and reefing cringles that would be familiar to any modern sailor of a traditionally rigged small boat. The reef points consist of short lengths of rope that pass through the fabric of the sail, with the rope locally unlaid so that it can be sewn to the surface of the sail. The reef points are used to tie up the unused part of the sail when the reefing cringles become the tack and clew of the reefed sail. This is the earliest known archaeological example of reef points. (Note: Iconographic information shows reef points being used in ships in early medieval times, but these went out of fashion for larger craft until reefing topsails were introduced in the mid-seventeenth century, followed ultimately by other square sails also having reef points.)

==== Chainwales ====
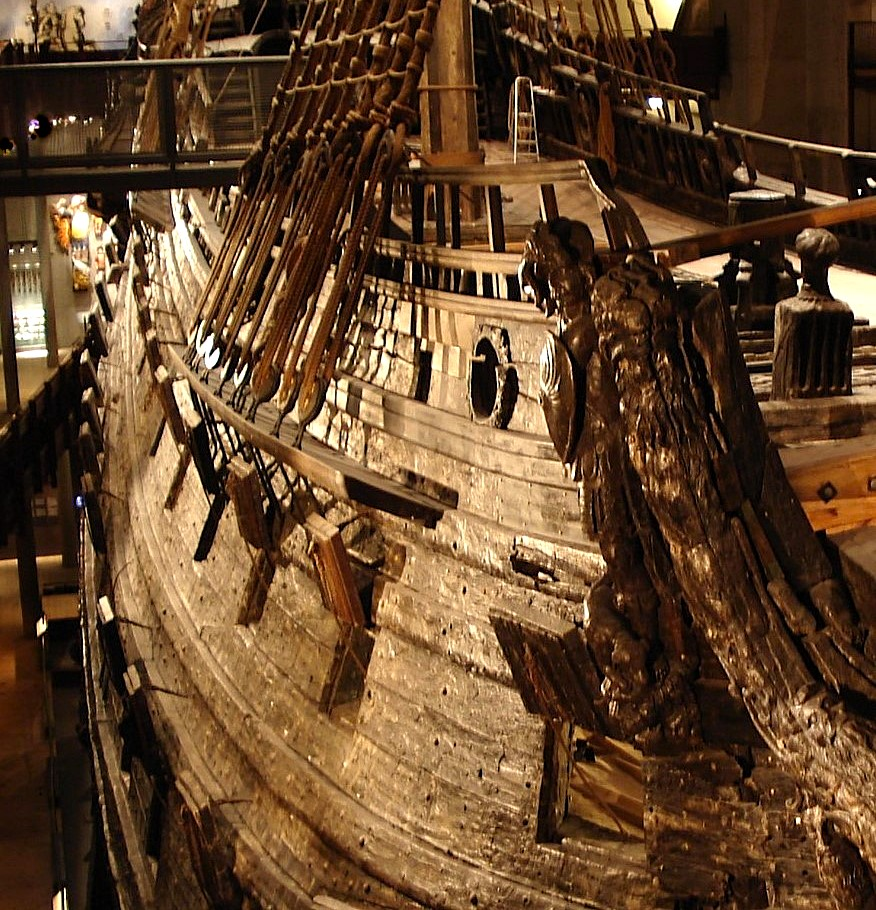
The fore starboard chainwale on Vasa. The chainwale is the thick plank on the outside of the hull with its edge against the hull. The deadeyes of the shrouds are above the chainwale and the chains that transfer the load in the shrouds to the hull are underneath.

The chainwales on Vasa are positioned above the gunports for the upper gundeck. This was the typical Dutch arrangement for a ship with two decks until the 1620s. Thereafter, Dutch shipyards used a lower attachment point, between the two rows of gunports, as was already done in other European shipyards.

The alignment of the chains that pass over the chainwales can be detected in the marks left in the wood (even though the iron components have corroded away). These alignments can be extrapolated to follow the route of each shroud to the top of each lower mast, but with one exception at each chainwale. This non-conforming position would be suitable for a topmast backstay. This extra rigging component had recently been introduced in European shipyards, with the earliest known instance in 1611. Giving greater support to the topmast with a backstay allowed the topsail to take a role as the main working sail on each mast. As square rig evolved, the topsail became the first square sail to be set and the last to be furled. Before this change, the course was the first sail to be set and the last to be taken in, with topsails simply providing extra sail area in lighter winds. This is a substantial change in sail-handling technique. (Note: If a topsail is the only sail set on a mast, the lower yard has to be in the hoisted position underneath the topsail, so as to give somewhere for the topsail sheets to attach. This introduces the concept of lower yards that remain permanently hoisted. Consequently, there is more work to be done aloft – ultimately square rig changed to have a different arrangement to brail the sail up to the yard (replacing the martnet) and footropes were invented to assist work aloft, both c. 1650.) The sails set on Vasa at the time of her loss conform with this interpretation of the chainwales – that Vasa was preferentially using topsails over courses. Vasa also has the main topsail halyard knighthead (Note: A knighthead is a timber post (technically a type of bitt) at the foot of a mast to which, typically, halyards were made fast. Often, they have sheaves fitted in them to match the blocks with which they are paired to give a large mechanical advantage in lifting heavy loads. The knightheads in Vasa are attached to deck beams with open-face dovetail joints, some of them extending over two decks to distribute the large loads involved. They get their name from the heads carved into the top of them for decoration. The main knighthead on Vasa is below decks, on the upper gundeck. Here the fall from the tackle could be taken to the main capstan.) positioned a distance abaft (Note: "Abaft" is the adjective meaning "nearer the stern". The corresponding adverb is "aft". Examples of both usages: "he walked aft"; "the rope was fastened on the after cleat".) the foot of the mast and angled to point at the main-topmast head. This gives further support to the main topmast, with the halyard having a secondary role as a backstay.

==== Blocks and deadeyes ====
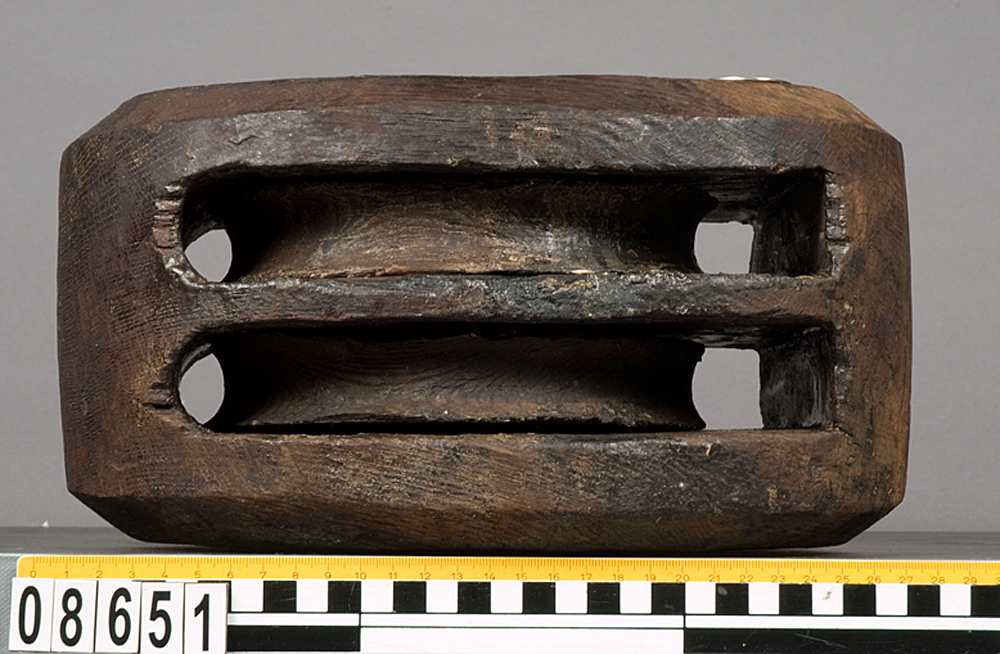
A double block recovered from Vasa. It is made entirely of ash for both the shell and the sheaves. Though it is not visible in this picture, this example had the less common wrought iron strop to attach it to a fixed surface or the object being moved.

Blocks, or pulleys, are a means of redirecting the path of a rope or providing a mechanical advantage, either on its own or in combination with other blocks, to increase the force applied. The majority of blocks have a sheave which rotates on an axle – the rope that goes through the block fits into a groove cut in the sheave. The load in the rope is transferred from the axle to the shell of the block, which, at the time of Vasa, has a rope strop (usually) or wrought iron strap which goes around the shell and is used to fasten the block to another object. More rarely, a block does not have a sheave. It is then termed a "dead block".

Deadeyes are used in the standing rigging. These are the pieces of wood that, operating in pairs, allow adjustment of the length of shrouds or stays. A lanyard passes through a number of holes in each pair – tightening the lanyard shortens the distance between the pair of deadeyes. Since natural fibre ropes can change in length depending on the amount of moisture in them, the standing rigging of a 17th-century ship needed much more adjustment than a more modern sailing vessel.

=== Steering ===
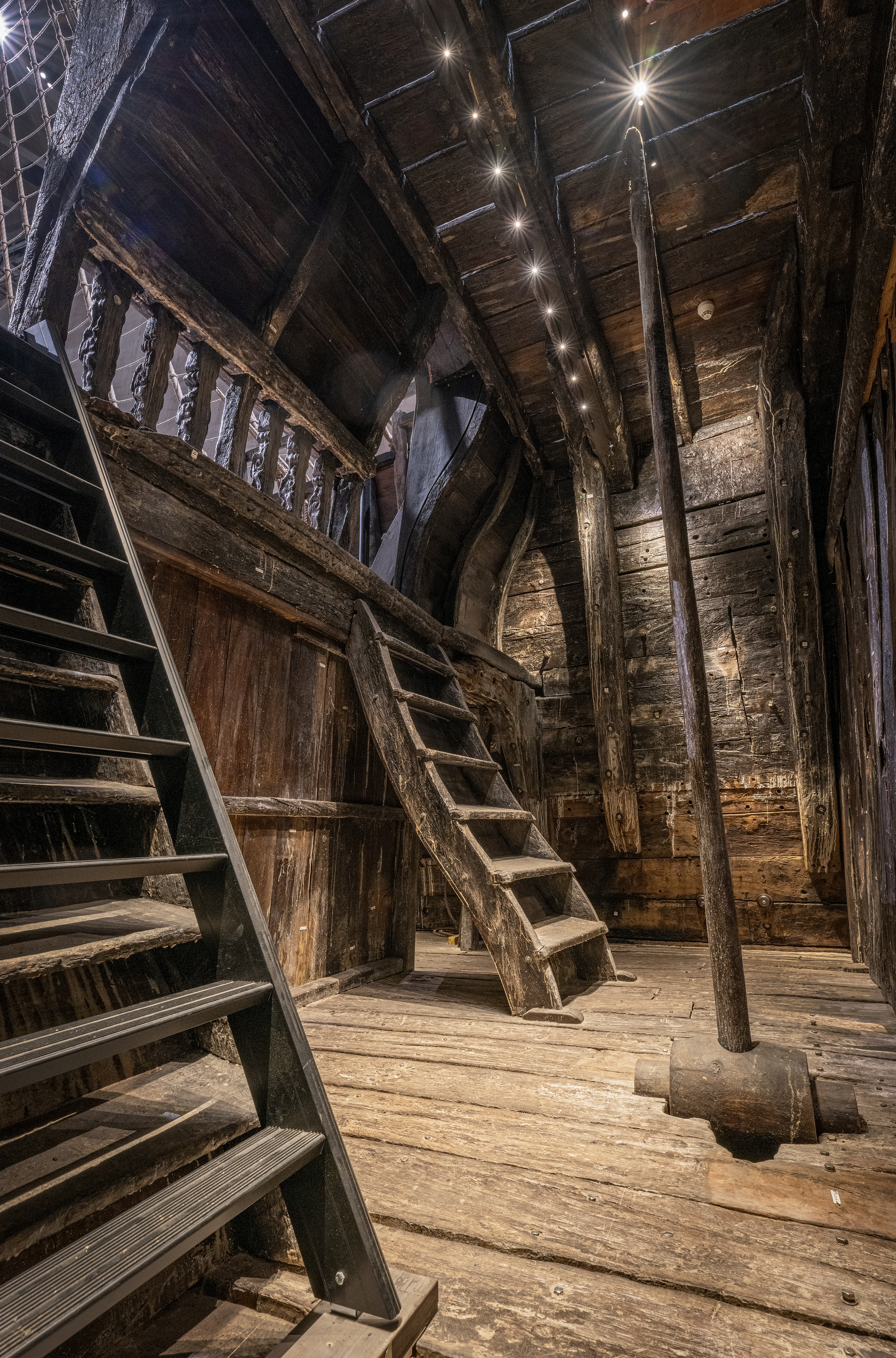
The whipstaff in the steerage compartment of Vasa. The photograph is taken from the port side. The opening which provided some view of the sails is in the upper left of the picture.

Vasa was steered with a whipstaff (as opposed to a wheel, which started to be used in the next century). This is a vertical lever that passes through a sliding bearing in the deck (the "rowle") and operates on the end of the helm (or tiller), which in turn is attached to the top of the rudder. The steering position (the "steerage") is immediately in front of the entrance to the great cabin, on the upper gundeck. It occupies a double-height space, with 3.24 metres (10.6 ft) of headroom to accommodate the length of the whipstaff. There are balustraded openings through which the helmsman has some view of the sails. The addition of a step across the width of the steerage suggests that this visibility had not turned out as planned and needed some last-minute adjustment. The helm is located a deck below, in the gunroom, which is the aftermost compartment on the lower gundeck. It passes through an opening in the stern to connect to the top of the rudder head.

Vasa represents the only complete surviving and investigated example of a whipstaff steering system. Study of this has changed the presumptions of how effective this method was, as a number of replicas of ships have been built with a whipstaff, and the system has been found to be fully effective.

In operation, the steering system of Vasa was able to apply 23 degrees of angle to the rudder. This is limited by the width of the hull structure where the helm moves from side to side in the gunroom. This angle is sufficient to steer the ship, as amounts greater than this create a lot of extra drag without increasing the turning moment significantly. At low angles, the whipstaff acts as a lever on the helm. At greater angles it works more as a push stick (rather like the tiller extension on a modern sailing dinghy).

The steerage compartment was equipped with a binnacle, a wooden cabinet (made without any iron fastenings or components) which stood against the forward bulkhead on the centre-line. It has space for two compasses, one on each side of a central light. Each compass can be viewed through a glass window. (Note: No steering compasses were recovered from the wreck of Vasa, but the survival of the bittacle is clear evidence of their existence.) This allows the helmsman to see the course being steered whichever side of the whipstaff they are standing – this type of steering requires the operator to be much more mobile than with a steering wheel, so a single compass would be ineffective. Given the limited visibility from the steering position, the compasses and a view of some of the sails were the only means of staying on the course ordered from the con position on the deck above. The option of steering with reference to a distant landmark or another ship is not available.

The whipstaff started to be replaced with wheel steering sometime in the 18th century, though the precise date of this changeover is unknown.

=== Ornamentation ===
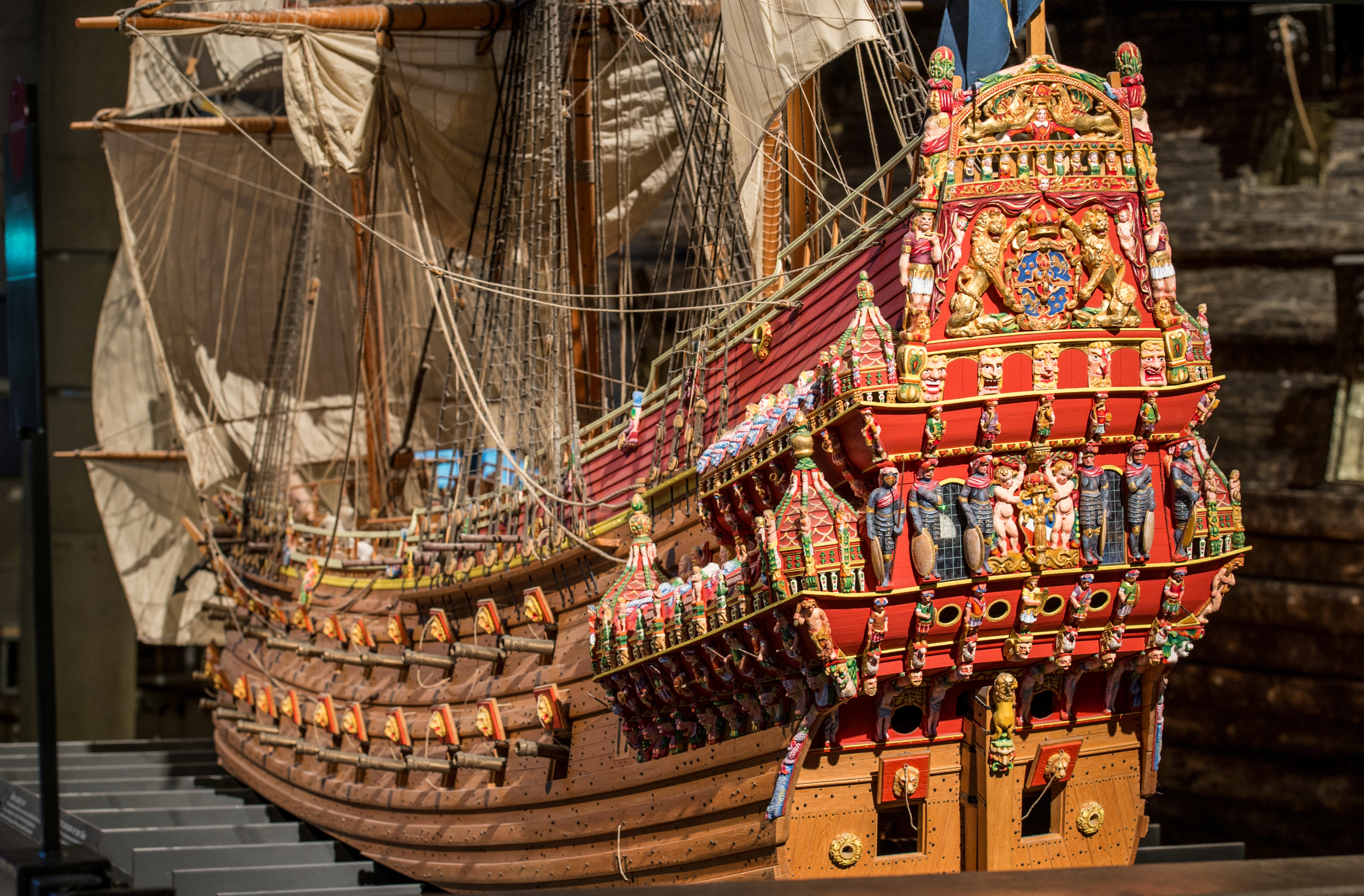
The 1:10 museum model showing the richly decorated stern with miniature sculptures painted in what is believed to be the original color scheme.

As was the custom with warships at the time, Vasa was decorated with sculptures intended to glorify the authority, wisdom and martial prowess of the monarch and also to deride, taunt and intimidate the enemy. The sculptures made up a considerable part of the effort and cost of building the ship. The symbolism used in decorating the ship was mostly based on the Renaissance idealization of Roman and Greek antiquity, which had been imported from Italy through German and Dutch artists. Imagery borrowed from Mediterranean antiquity dominates the motifs, but also include figures from the Old Testament and even a few from ancient Egypt. Many of the figures are in Dutch grotesque style, depicting fantastic and frightening creatures, including mermaids, wild men, sea monsters and tritons. The decoration inside the ship is much sparser and is largely confined to the steerage and the great cabin, at the after end of the upper gundeck.

A view of the sculptures adorning the outside of the captain's quarters.

Residues of paint have been found on many sculptures and on other parts of the ship. The entire ornamentation was once painted in vivid colors. The sides of the beakhead (the protruding structure below the bowsprit), the bulwarks (the protective railing around the weather deck), the roofs of the quarter galleries, and the background of the after upper works were all painted red, while the sculptures were decorated in bright colors, and the dazzling effect of these was in some places emphasized with gold leaf. Previously, it was believed that the background color had been blue and that all sculptures had been almost entirely gilded, and this is reflected in many paintings of Vasa from the 1970s to the early 1990s, such as the lively and dramatic drawings of Björn Landström or the painting by Francis Smitheman. In the late 1990s, this view was revised and the colors are properly reflected in more recent reproductions of the ship's decoration by maritime painter Tim Thompson and the 1:10 scale model in the museum. Vasa is an example not so much of the heavily gilded sculptures of early Baroque art but rather "the last gasps of the medieval sculpture tradition" with its fondness for gaudy colors, in a style that today would be considered extravagant or even vulgar.

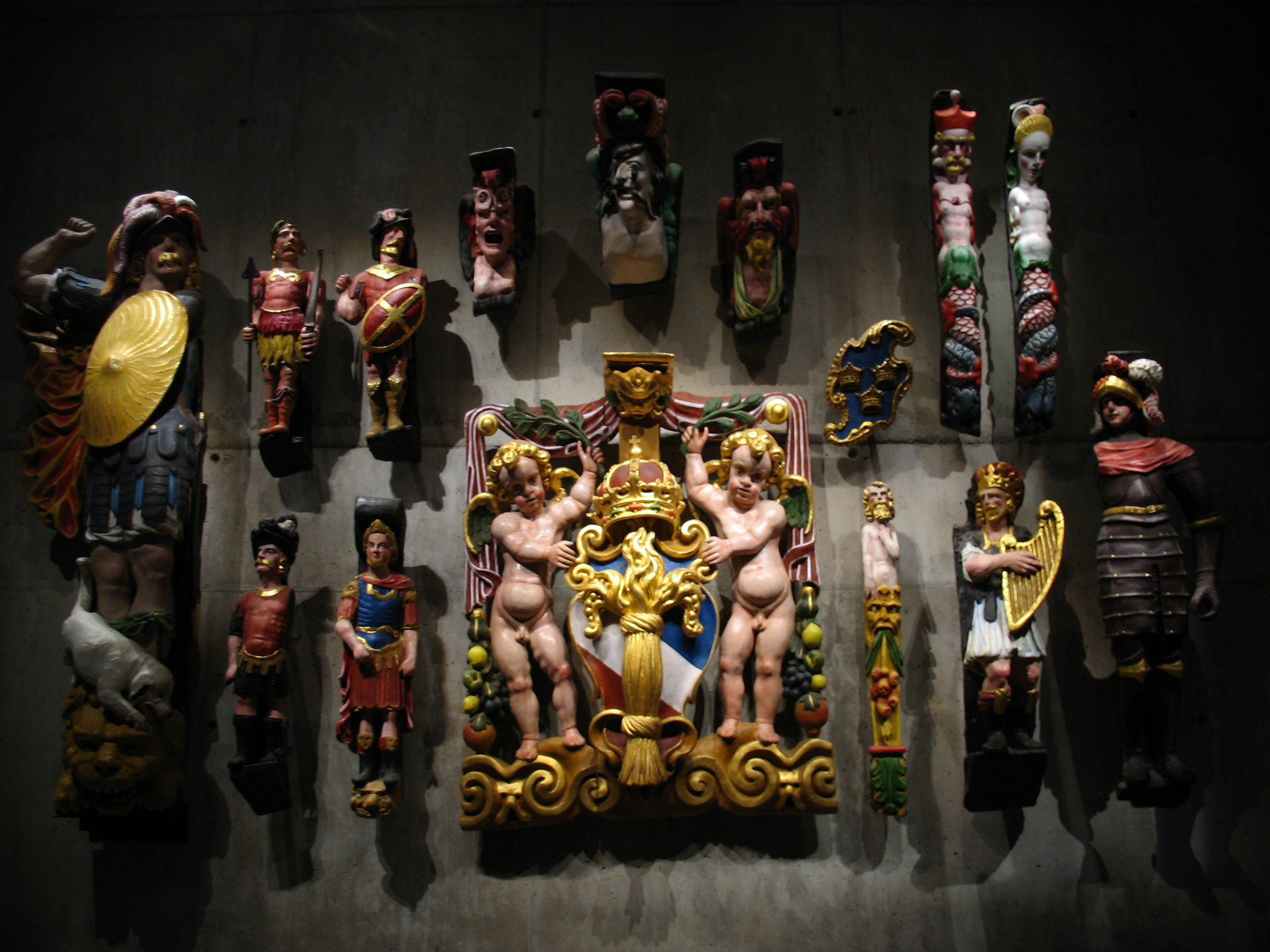
Full-scale, painted modern replicas of some of the ship's sculptures exhibited at the Vasa Museum.

The sculptures are carved out of oak, pine or linden, and many of the larger pieces, like the huge 3-meter (9.8-foot) long figurehead lion, consist of several parts carved individually and fitted together with bolts. Close to 500 sculptures, most of which are concentrated on the high stern and its galleries and on the beakhead, are found on the ship. The figure of Hercules appears as a pair of pendants, one younger and one older, on each side of the lower stern galleries; the pendants depict opposite aspects of the ancient hero, who was extremely popular during antiquity as well as in 17th-century European art. On the stern are biblical and nationalistic symbols and images. A particularly popular motif is the lion, which can be found as mascarons originally fitted on the insides of the gunport doors, grasping the royal coat of arms on either side, the figurehead, and even clinging to the top of the rudder. Each side of the beakhead originally had 20 figures (though only 19 have actually been found) that depicted Roman emperors from Tiberius to Septimius Severus.

Overall, almost all heroic and positive imagery is directly or indirectly identified with the king and was originally intended to glorify him as a wise and powerful ruler. The only actual portrait of the king is located at the very top of the stern. Here he is depicted as a young boy with long, flowing hair, being crowned by two griffins representing the king's father, Charles IX. (Note: Before being crowned as king, Charles had been duke of Södermanland, whose coat of arms included a griffin segreant, standing with its front legs raised.)

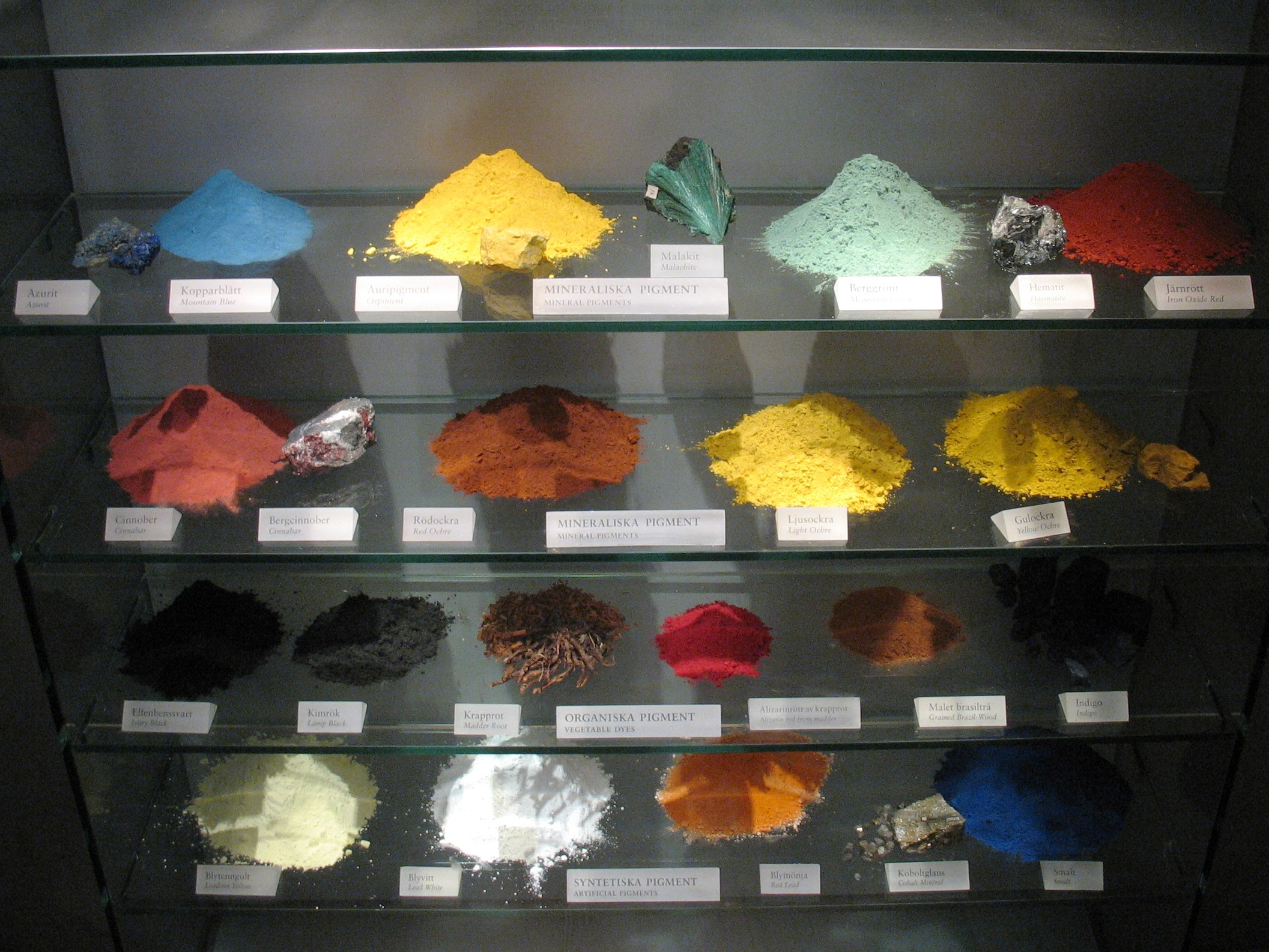
A recreation of the color pigments that were used by the naval shipyard where the ship was built; exhibit at the Vasa Museum.

A team of at least six expert sculptors worked for a minimum of two years on the sculptures, most likely with the assistance of an unknown number of apprentices and assistants. No direct credit for any of the sculptures has been provided, but the distinct style of one of the most senior artists, Mårten Redtmer, is clearly identifiable. Other accomplished artists, like Hans Clausink, Johan Didrichson Tijsen (or Thessen in Swedish) and possibly Marcus Ledens, are known to have been employed for extensive work at the naval yards at the time Vasa was built, but their respective styles are not distinct enough to associate them directly with any specific sculptures.

The artistic quality of the sculptures varies considerably, and about four distinct styles can be identified. The only artist who has been positively associated with various sculptures is Mårten Redtmer, whose style has been described as "powerful, lively and naturalistic". He was responsible for a considerable number of the sculptures. These include some of the most important and prestigious pieces: the figurehead lion, the royal coat of arms, and the sculpture of the king at the top of the stern. Two of the other styles are described as "elegant ... a little stereotyped and manneristic", and of a "heavy, leisurely but nevertheless rich and lively style", respectively. The fourth and last style, deemed clearly inferior to the other three, is described as "stiff and ungainly" and was done by other carvers, perhaps even apprentices, of lesser skill.

== Maiden voyage ==
=== Sinking ===
Central Stockholm and the movements of Vasa from Skeppsgården ('navy yard') to the anchoring place near the old royal castle where she was fitted and armed in the spring of 1628, and finally the location where she foundered and sank.

On 10 August 1628, Captain Söfring Hansson ordered Vasa to depart on her maiden voyage to the naval station at Älvsnabben. The day was calm, and the only wind was a light breeze from the southwest. The ship was warped (Note: Warping involves moving a ship by hauling in ropes ("warps") attached to a solid object such as bollard on a quayside, or to an anchor.) along the eastern waterfront of the city to the southern side of the harbor, where four sails were set, and the ship made way to the east. The gun ports were open, and the guns were out to fire a salute as the ship left Stockholm.

As Vasa passed under the lee of the bluffs to the south (now called Södermalm), a gust of wind filled her sails, and she heeled suddenly to port. The sheets were cast off, and the ship slowly righted herself as the gust passed. At Tegelviken, where there is a gap in the bluffs, an even stronger gust again forced the ship onto her port side, this time pushing the open lower gunports under the surface, allowing water to rush in onto the lower gundeck. The water building up on the deck quickly exceeded the ship's minimal righting ability, and water continued to pour in until it ran down into the hold. The ship swiftly sank to a depth of 32 m (105 ft) only 120 m (390 ft) from shore. Survivors clung to debris or the upper masts, which were still above the surface. Many nearby boats rushed to their aid, but despite these efforts and the short distance to land, 30 people reportedly perished with the ship. Vasa sank in full view of a crowd of hundreds, if not thousands, of mostly ordinary Stockholmers who had come to see the ship set sail. The crowd included foreign ambassadors, in effect spies of Gustavus Adolphus' allies and enemies.

=== Inquest ===
The Council sent a letter to the king the day after the loss, telling him of the sinking, but it took over two weeks to reach him in Poland. "Imprudence and negligence" must have been the cause, he wrote angrily in his reply, demanding in no uncertain terms that the guilty parties be punished. Captain Söfring Hansson, who survived the disaster, was immediately taken for questioning. Under initial interrogation, he swore that the guns had been properly secured and that the crew was sober.

A full inquest before a tribunal of members of the Privy Council and Admiralty took place at the Royal Palace on 5 September 1628. Each of the surviving officers was questioned as was the supervising shipwright and a number of expert witnesses. Also present at the inquest was the Admiral of the Realm, Carl Carlsson Gyllenhielm. The object of the inquest was as much or more to find a scapegoat as to find out why the ship had sunk. Whoever the committee might find guilty for the fiasco would face a severe penalty.

Surviving crew members were questioned one by one about the handling of the ship at the time of the disaster. Was she rigged properly for the wind? Was the crew sober? Was the ballast properly stowed? Were the guns properly secured? However, no one was prepared to take the blame. Crewmen and contractors formed two camps; each tried to blame the other, and everyone swore he had done his duty without fault and it was during the inquest that the details of the stability demonstration were revealed.

Next, attention was directed to the shipbuilders. "Why did you build the ship so narrow, so badly and without enough bottom that it capsized?" the prosecutor asked the shipwright Jacobsson. Jacobsson stated that he built the ship as directed by Henrik Hybertsson (the original shipbuilder, recently deceased), who in turn had followed the specification approved by the king. Jacobsson had in fact widened the ship by 1 foot 5 inches (43 cm) after taking over responsibility for the construction, but construction of the ship was too far advanced to allow further widening.

In the end, no guilty party could be found. The answer Arendt de Groote gave when asked by the court why the ship sank was "Only God knows". Gustavus Adolphus had approved all measurements and armaments, and the ship was built according to the instructions and loaded with the number of guns specified. In the end, no one was punished or found guilty for negligence, and the blame effectively fell on the dead Henrik Hybertsson.

== Vasa as a wreck ==
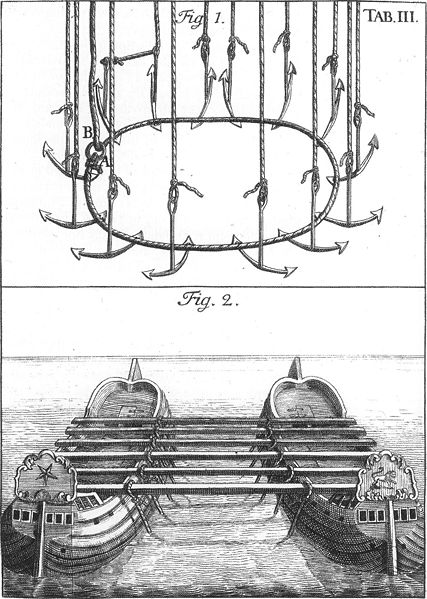
An illustration from a treatise on salvaging from 1734, showing the traditional method of raising a wreck with the help of anchors and ships or hulks as pontoons, basically the same method that was used to raise Vasa in the 20th century.

Less than three days after the disaster, a contract was signed for the ship to be raised. However, those efforts were unsuccessful. The earliest attempts at raising Vasa by English engineer Ian Bulmer resulted in righting the ship but also got her more securely stuck in the mud, which was one of the biggest impediments to the earliest attempts at recovery. Salvaging technology in the early 17th century was much more primitive than today, but the recovery of ships used roughly the same principles as were used to raise Vasa more than 300 years later. Two ships or hulks were placed parallel to either side above the wreck, and ropes attached to several anchors were sent down and hooked to the ship. The two hulks were filled with as much water as was safe, the ropes tightened, and the water pumped out. The sunken ship then rose with the ships on the surface and could be towed to shallower waters. The process was then repeated until the entire ship was successfully raised above water level. Even if the underwater weight of Vasa was not great, the mud in which she had settled made her sit more securely on the bottom and required considerable lifting power to overcome.

More than 30 years after the ship's sinking, in 1663–1665, Albreckt von Treileben and Andreas Peckell mounted an effort to recover the valuable guns. With a simple diving bell, the team of Swedish and Finnish divers retrieved more than 50 of them. Such activity waned when it became clear that the ship could not be raised by the technology of the time. However, Vasa did not fall completely into obscurity after the recovery of the guns. The ship was mentioned in several histories of Sweden and the Swedish Navy, and the location of the wreck appeared on harbor charts of Stockholm in the 19th century. In 1844, the navy officer Anton Ludwig Fahnehjelm turned in a request for salvaging rights to the ship, claiming he had located her. Fahnehjelm was an inventor who designed an early form of light diving suit and had previously been involved in other salvage operations. There were dives made on the wreck in 1895–1896, and a commercial salvage company applied for a permit to raise or salvage the wreck in 1920, but this was turned down. In 1999, a witness also claimed that his father, a petty officer in the Swedish navy, had taken part in diving exercises on Vasa in the years before World War I.

=== Deterioration ===
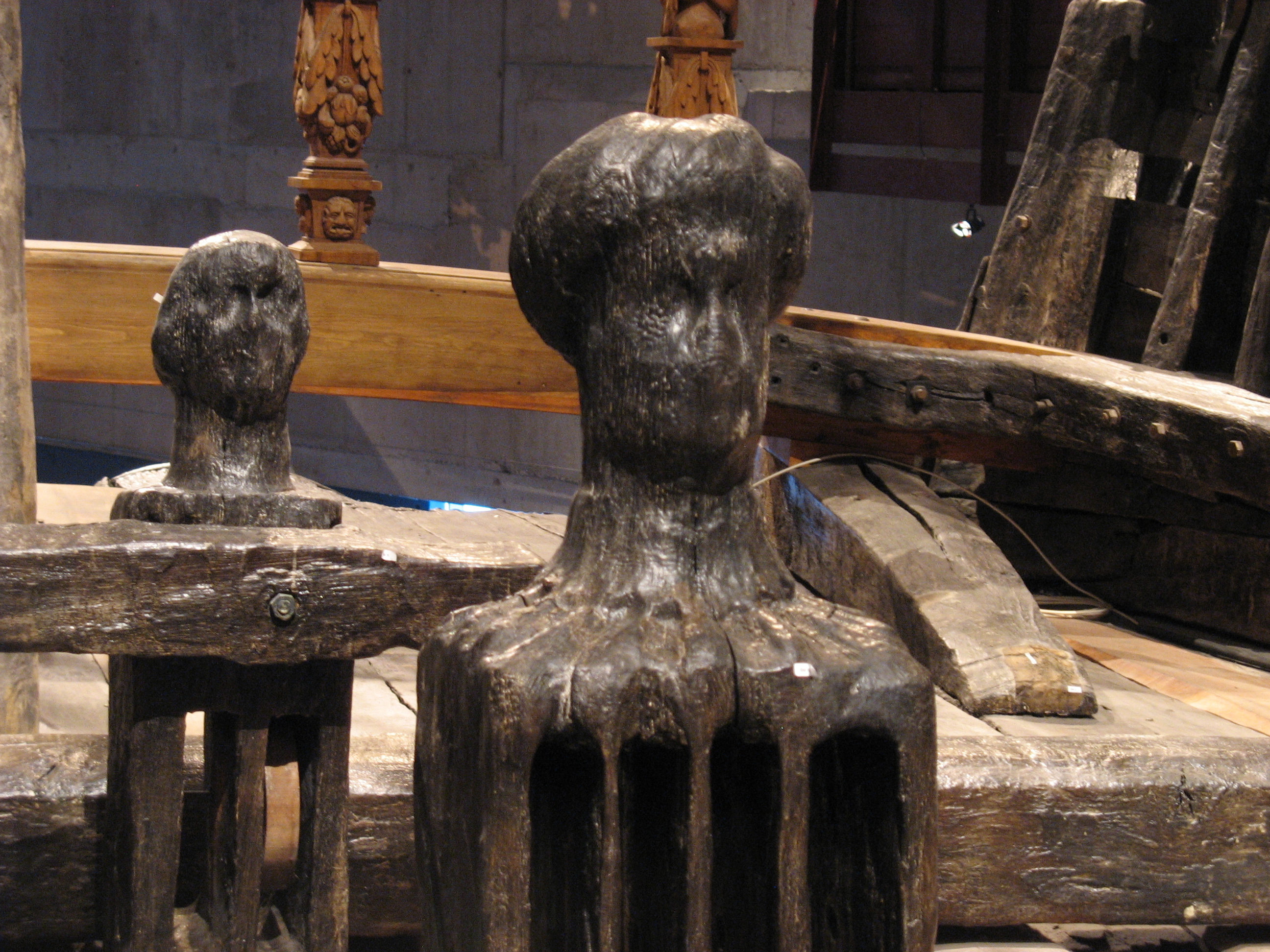
Two of the knightheads, posts fitted with the lower sheaves of heavy tackles used for hoisting the yards. They are located on the weather deck, close to the mast. The details of carved heads have been eroded almost beyond recognition by the currents of Stockholms ström.

In the 333 years that Vasa lay on the bottom of Stockholm harbor (called Stockholms ström, "the Stream", in Swedish), the ship and her contents were subject to several destructive forces, first among which were decomposition and erosion. Among the first things to decompose were the thousands of iron bolts that held the beakhead and much of the sterncastle together, and this included all of the ship's wooden sculptures. Almost all of the iron on the ship rusted away within a few years of the sinking, and only large objects, such as anchors, or items made of cast iron, such as cannonballs, survived.

Organic materials fared better in the anaerobic conditions, and so wood, cloth and leather are often in very good condition, but objects exposed to the currents were eroded by the sediment in the water, so that some are barely recognizable. Objects which fell off the hull into the mud after the nails corroded through were well protected, so that many of the sculptures still retain areas of paint and gilding. Of the human remains, most of the soft tissue was consumed, leaving only the bones, which were often held together only by clothing, although in one case, hair, nails and brain tissue survived.

The parts of the hull held together by joinery and wooden treenails remained intact for as much as two centuries, suffering gradual erosion of surfaces exposed to the water, unless they were disturbed by outside forces. Eventually the entire sterncastle, the high, aft portion of the ship that housed the officers' quarters and held up the transom, gradually collapsed into the mud with all the decorative sculptures. The quarter galleries, which were merely nailed to the sides of the sterncastle, collapsed fairly quickly and were found lying almost directly below their original locations.

Human activity was the most destructive factor, as the initial salvage efforts, the recovery of the guns, and the final salvage in the 20th century all left their marks. Peckell and Treileben broke up and removed much of the planking of the weather deck to get to the cannons on the decks below. Peckell reported that he had recovered 30 cartloads of wood from the ship; these might have included not just planking and structural details but also some of the sculptures which today are missing, such as the life-size Roman warrior near the bow and the sculpture of Septimius Severus that adorned the port side of the beakhead.

Since Vasa lay in a busy shipping channel, ships occasionally dropped anchor over her, and one large anchor demolished most of the upper sterncastle, probably in the 19th century. Construction work in Stockholm harbor usually entails blasting of bedrock, and the resulting tonnes of rubble were often dumped in the harbor; some of this landed on the ship, causing further damage to the stern and the upper deck.

=== Vasa rediscovered ===
In the early 1950s, amateur archaeologist Anders Franzén considered the possibility of recovering wrecks from the cold brackish waters of the Baltic because, he reasoned, they were free from the shipworm Teredo navalis, which usually destroys submerged wood rapidly in warmer, saltier seas. Franzén had previously been successful in locating wrecks such as Riksäpplet and Lybska Svan, and after long and tedious research he began looking for Vasa as well. He spent many years probing the waters without success around the many assumed locations of the wreckage. He did not succeed until, based on accounts of an unknown topographical anomaly just south of the Gustav V dock on Beckholmen, he narrowed his search.

In 1956, with a home-made, gravity-powered coring probe, he located a large wooden object almost parallel to the mouth of dock on Beckholmen. The location of the ship received considerable attention, even if the identification of the ship could not be determined without closer investigation. Soon after the announcement of the find, planning got underway to determine how to excavate and raise Vasa. The Swedish Navy was involved from the start, as were various museums and the National Heritage board, representatives of which eventually formed the Vasa Committee, the predecessor of the Vasa Board.

=== Recovery ===
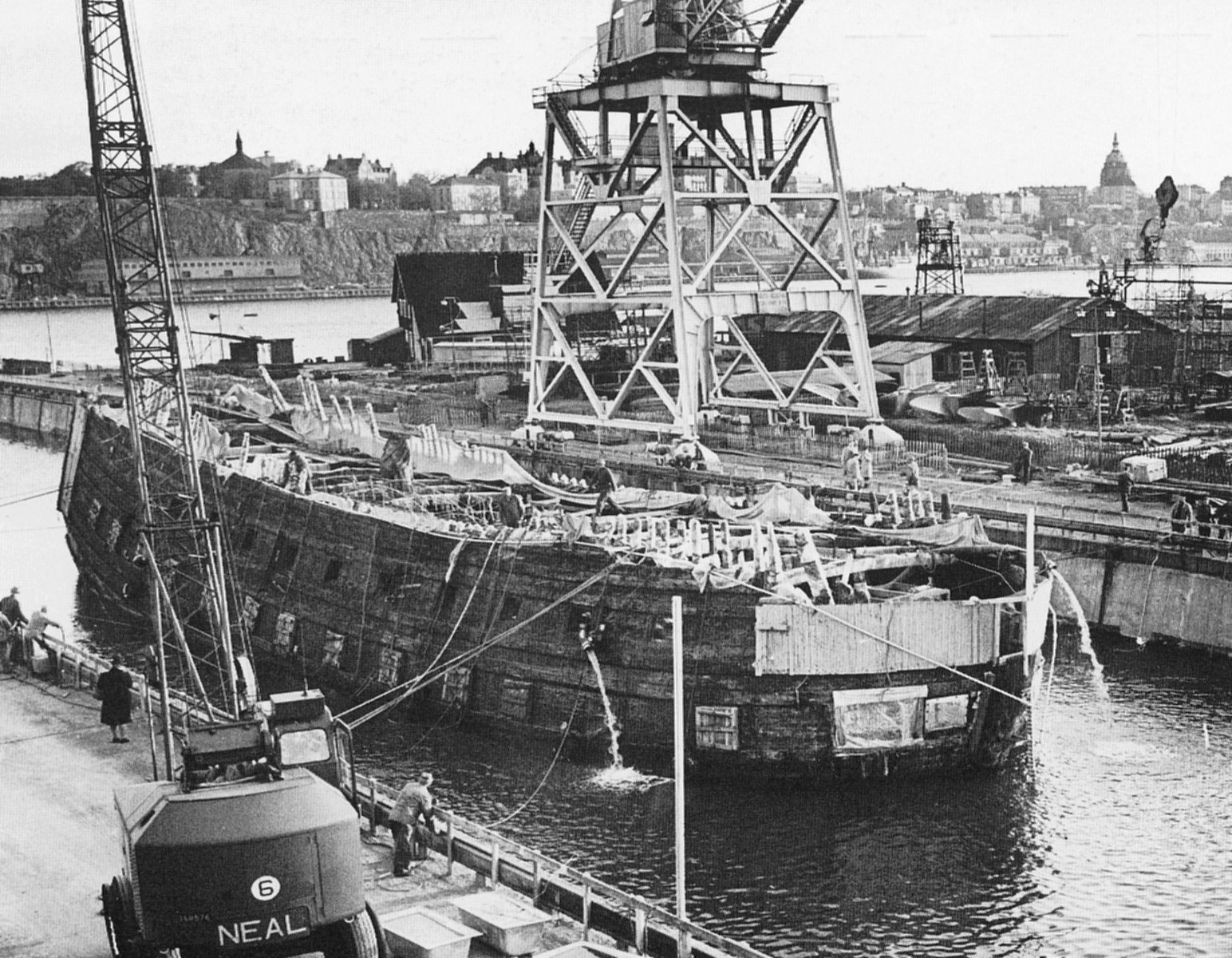
The hull of the Vasa after recovery operations, 14 May 1961

A number of possible recovery methods were proposed, including filling the ship with ping-pong balls and freezing her in a block of ice, but the method chosen by the Vasa Board (which succeeded the Vasa Committee) was essentially the same one attempted immediately after the sinking. Divers spent two years digging six tunnels under the ship for steel cable slings, which were taken to a pair of lifting pontoons at the surface. The work under the ship was extremely dangerous, requiring the divers to cut tunnels through the clay with high-pressure water jets and suck up the resulting slurry with a dredge, all while working in total darkness with hundreds of tonnes of mud-filled ship overhead. A persistent risk was that the wreck could shift or settle deeper into the mud while a diver was working in a tunnel, trapping him underneath the wreckage. The almost vertical sections of the tunnels near the side of the hull could also potentially collapse and bury a diver inside. Despite the dangerous conditions, more than 1,300 dives were made in the salvage operation without any serious accidents.

Each time the pontoons were pumped full, the cables tightened and the pontoons pumped out, the ship was brought a meter closer to the surface. In a series of 18 lifts in August and September 1959, the ship was moved from a depth of 32 to 16 meters (105 to 52 feet) in the more sheltered area of Kastellholmsviken, where divers could work more safely to prepare for the final lift. Over the course of a year and a half, a small team of commercial divers cleared debris and mud from the upper decks to lighten the ship, and made the hull as watertight as possible. The gun ports were closed by means of temporary lids, a temporary replacement of the collapsed sterncastle was constructed, and many of the holes from the iron bolts that had rusted away were plugged. The final lift began on 8 April 1961, and on the morning of 24 April, Vasa was ready to return to the world for the first time in 333 years. Press from all over the world, television cameras, 400 invited guests on barges and boats, and thousands of spectators on shore watched as the first timbers broke the surface. The ship was then emptied of water and mud and towed to the Gustav V dry dock on Beckholmen, where the ship was floated on her own keel onto a concrete pontoon, on which the hull still stands.

From the end of 1961 to December 1988, Vasa was housed in a temporary facility called Wasavarvet ("The Vasa Shipyard"), which included exhibit space as well as the activities centred on the ship. A building was erected over the ship on her pontoon, but it was very cramped, making conservation work awkward. Visitors could view the ship from just two levels, and the maximum viewing distance was in most places only a couple of meters, which made it difficult for viewers to get an overall view of the ship. In 1981, the Swedish government decided that a permanent building was to be constructed, and a design competition was organized. The winning design, by the Swedish architects Månsson and Dahlbäck, called for a large hall over the ship in a polygonal, industrial style. Ground was broken in 1987, and Vasa was towed into the half-finished Vasa Museum in December 1988. The museum was officially opened to the public in 1990.

== Archaeology ==
Vasa posed an unprecedented challenge for archaeologists. Never before had a four-storey structure, with most of its original contents largely undisturbed, been available for excavation. The conditions under which the team had to work added to the difficulties. The ship had to be kept wet in order that she not dry out and crack before she could be properly conserved. Digging had to be performed under a constant drizzle of water and in a sludge-covered mud that could be more than 1 metre (3 ft 3 in) deep.

In order to establish find locations, the hull was divided into several sections demarcated by the many structural beams, the decking and by a line drawn along the centre of the ship from stern to bow. For the most part, the decks were excavated individually, though at times work progressed on more than one deck level simultaneously.

=== Ship structure ===
Vasa had four preserved decks: the upper and lower gundecks, the hold and the orlop. Because of the constraints of preparing the ship for conservation, the archaeologists had to work quickly, in 13-hour shifts during the first week of excavation. The upper gundeck was greatly disturbed by the various salvage projects between 1628 and 1961, and it contained not only material that had fallen down from the rigging and upper deck, but also more than three centuries of harbor refuse.

The decks below were progressively less disturbed. The gundecks contained not just gun carriages, the three surviving cannons, and other objects of a military nature, but were also where most of the personal possessions of the sailors had been stored at the time of the sinking. These included a wide range of loose finds, as well as chests and casks with spare clothing and shoes, tools and materials for mending, money (in the form of low-denomination copper coins), privately purchased provisions, and all of the everyday objects needed for life at sea.

=== Finds ===
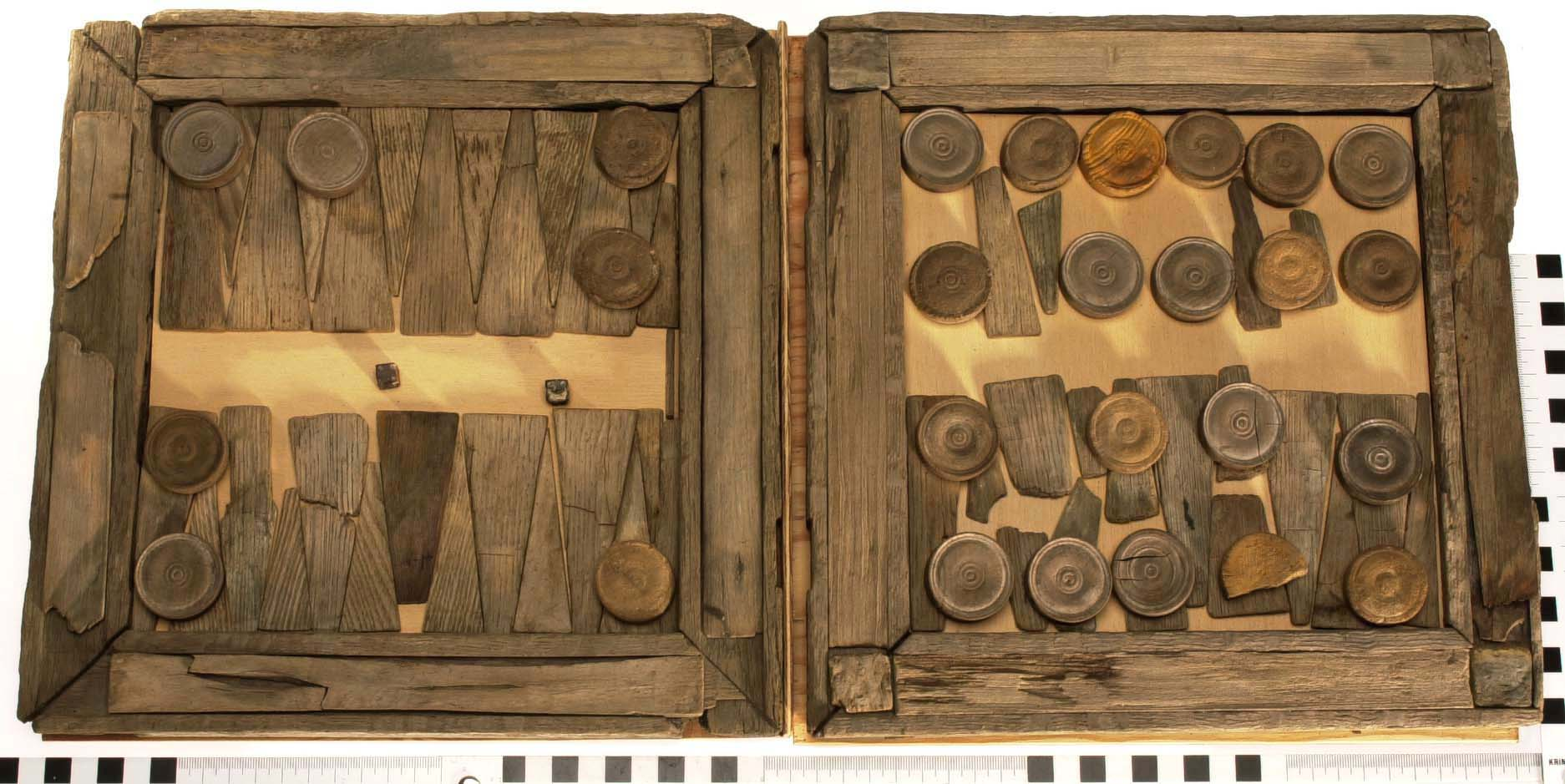
A backgammon set found on Vasa, complete with dice and markers

Most of the individual finds on board are of wood, testifying not only to the simple life on board, but to the generally unsophisticated state of Swedish material culture in the early 17th century. The lower decks were primarily used for storage, and so the hold was filled with barrels of provisions and gunpowder, coils of anchor cable, iron shot for the guns, and the personal possessions of some of the officers. On the orlop deck, a small compartment contained six of the ship's ten sails, rigging spares, and the working parts for the ship's pumps. Another compartment contained the possessions of the ship's carpenter, including a large tool chest.

After the ship herself had been salvaged and excavated, the site of the loss was excavated thoroughly during 1963–1967. This produced many items of rigging as well as structural timbers that had fallen off, particularly from the beakhead and sterncastle. Most of the sculptures that had decorated the exterior of the hull were also found in the mud, along with the ship's anchors and the skeletons of at least four people. The last object to be brought up was the 11.7-metre-long (38 ft) longboat, called esping in Swedish, found lying parallel to the ship and believed to be towed by Vasa when she sank.

Many of the more recent objects contaminating the site were disregarded when the finds were registered, but some were the remains of the 1660s salvage efforts, and others had their own stories to tell. Among the best-known of these was a statue of 20th-century Finnish runner Paavo Nurmi, which was placed on the ship as a prank by students of Helsinki University of Technology (now Aalto University) the night before the final lift.

== Causes of sinking ==
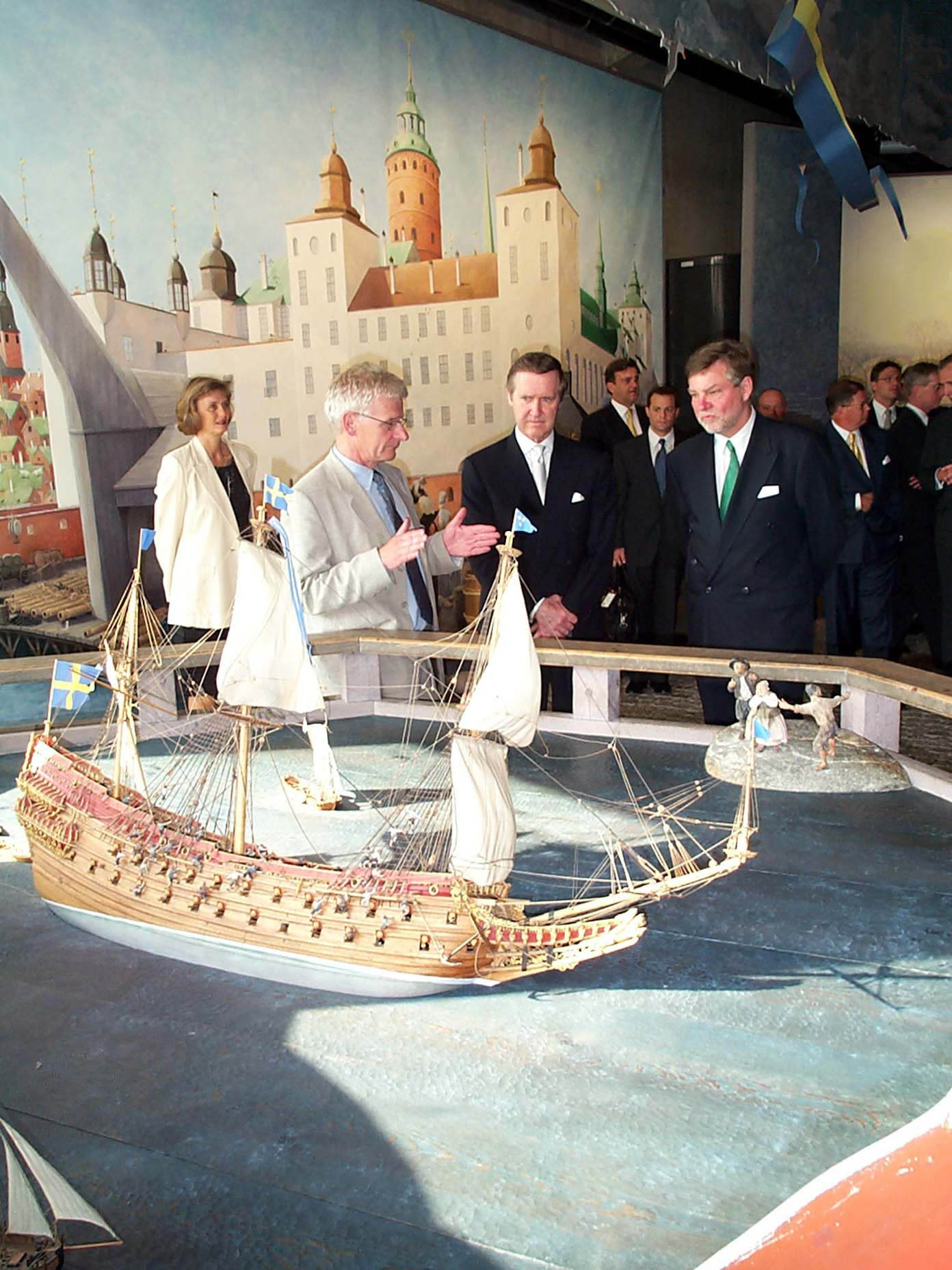
Former Vasa Museum Director Klas Helmerson (left) explaining aspects of the sinking of the ship to then US Defense Secretary William Cohen (centre) and Swedish Defense Minister Björn von Sydow (right).

Vasa sank because she had very little initial stability—resistance to heeling under the force of wind or waves acting on the hull. This was due to the distribution of mass in the hull structure, and to the ballast, guns, provisions, and other objects loaded on board placing a lot of weight too high in the ship. This put the centre of gravity very high relative to the centre of buoyancy, thus making the ship readily heel in response to little force, and not providing enough righting moment for her to become upright again.

The guns weighed little over 60 tonnes (59 long tons; 66 short tons), about 5% of the total displacement of the loaded ship, not enough in themselves to cause the ship to capsize. The reason for the high centre of gravity was the hull construction. The part of the hull above the waterline was too high and too heavily built in relation to the amount of hull in the water. The headroom in the decks was higher than necessary for crewmen who were, on average, 1.67 meters (5 feet 6 inches) tall, raising the placement of the weight of the decks and the guns higher than needed. In addition, the deck beams and their supporting timbers were over-dimensioned and more closely spaced than required for the loads they carried, contributing too much weight to the already tall and heavy upper works.

During construction both Swedish feet (of 29.69 cm) and Amsterdam feet (of 28.31 cm) were in use by different teams. Four rulers used by the workmen who built the ship have been found; two were calibrated in Swedish feet, of 12 Swedish inches, and the other two were calibrated in Amsterdam feet, of 11 Amsterdam inches. The use of different units of length on the two sides of the vessel caused the ship to be heavier on the port side.

Although the mathematical tools for calculating or predicting stability were still more than a century in the future, and 17th-century scientific ideas about how ships behaved in water were deeply flawed, the people associated with building and sailing ships for the Swedish navy were very much aware of the forces at work and their relationships to each other. In the last part of the inquest held after the sinking, a group of master shipwrights and senior naval officers were asked for their opinions about why the ship sank. Their discussion and conclusions show very clearly that they knew what had happened, and their verdict was summed up very clearly by one of the captains, who said that the ship did not have enough "belly" to carry the heavy upperworks. When other ships that predated stability calculations were found to lack stability, remedial action could be taken to increase the beam. This could involve adding an extra layer of planking below the waterline (this was called "girdling"). More drastically, the process of furring could be used: planking was removed and extra pieces of wood were added to the frames to increase the molded breadth. Then the planking was replaced.

Vasa might not have sunk when she did if the ship had sailed with the gunports closed. Ships with multiple tiers of gunports normally sailed with the lowest tier closed, since the pressure of wind on the sails would often push the hull over until the lower gunport sills were under water. For this reason the gunport covers were made with a double lip designed to seal well enough to keep out most of the water. Captain Söfring Hansson had ordered the lower gundeck ports closed once the ship began to take on water, but by then it was too late. If he had done it before he sailed, Vasa might not have sunk on that day.

== Conservation ==
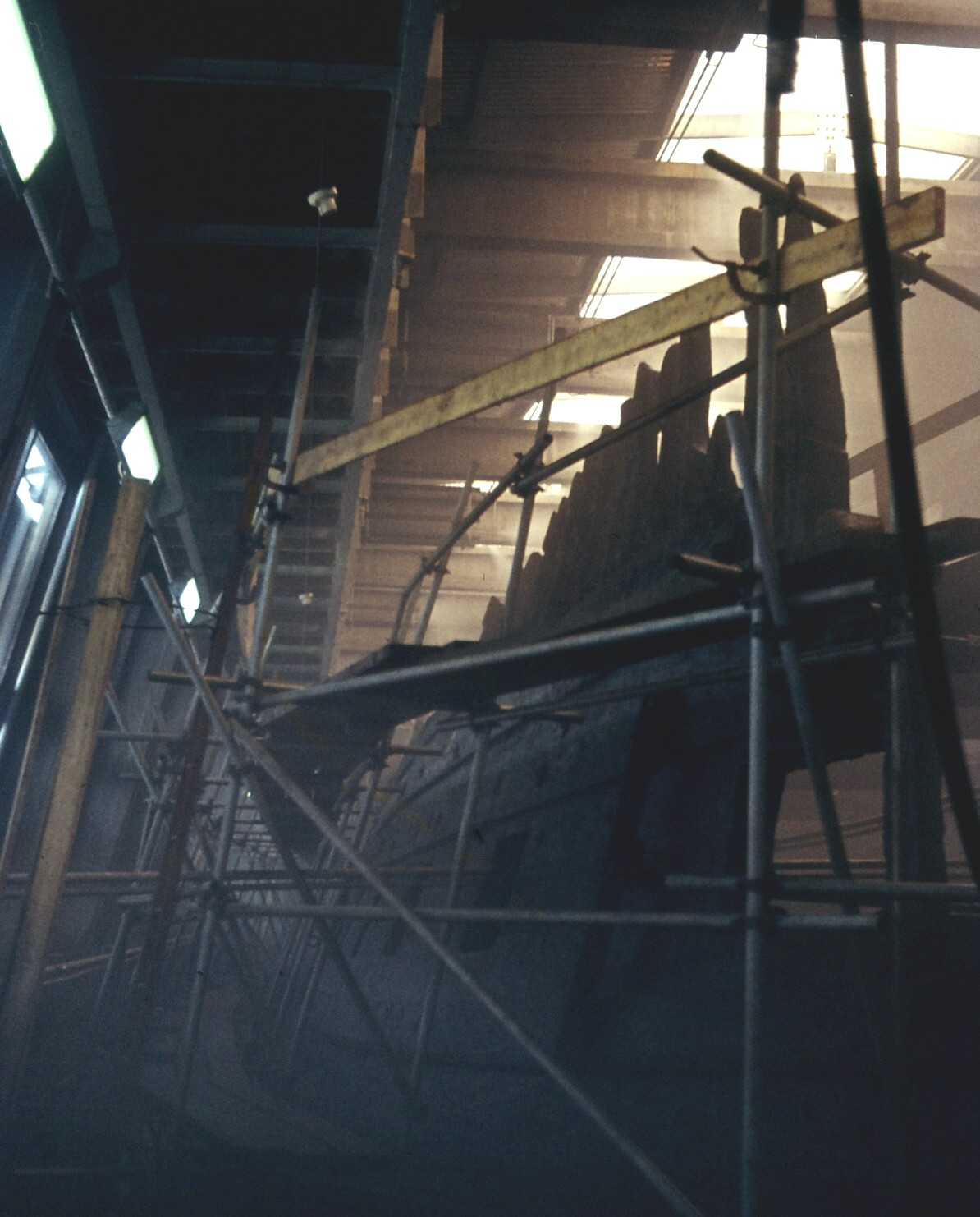
Vasa during the early stages of conservation at the Wasa Shipyard.

Although Vasa was in surprisingly good condition after 333 years at the bottom of the sea, she would have quickly deteriorated if the hull had been simply allowed to dry. The large bulk of Vasa, over 600 cubic meters (21,000 ft^{3}) of oak timber, constituted an unprecedented conservation problem. After some debate on how to best preserve the ship, conservation was carried out by impregnation with polyethylene glycol (PEG), a method that has since become the standard treatment for large, waterlogged wooden objects, such as the 16th-century English ship Mary Rose. Vasa was sprayed with PEG for 17 years, followed by a long period of slow drying, not entirely complete by 2011.

The reason that Vasa was so well-preserved was not just that the shipworm that normally devours wooden ships was absent, but also that the water of Stockholms ström was heavily polluted until the late 20th century. The highly toxic and hostile environment meant that even the toughest microorganisms that break down wood had difficulty surviving. This, and Vasa being newly built and undamaged when she sank, contributed to her conservation. However, some properties of the water were harmful. Chemicals present in the water around Vasa had penetrated the wood, and the timber was full of the corrosion products from the bolts and other iron objects which had corroded away. Once the ship was exposed to the air, reactions began inside the timber that produced acidic compounds. In the late 1990s, spots of white and yellow residue were noticed on Vasa and some of the associated artefacts; these turned out to be sulfate-containing salts that had formed on the surface of the wood when sulfides reacted with atmospheric oxygen. The salts on the surface of Vasa and objects found in and around her are not a threat in themselves despite the discoloring, but if they are from inside the wood, they may expand and crack the timber from inside. As of 2002, the amount of sulfuric acid in Vasa's hull was estimated to be more than 2 tonnes (4,400 lb), and more is continually being created. Enough sulfides are present in the ship to produce another 5,000 kilograms (11,000 pounds) of acid at a rate of about 100 kilograms (220 pounds) per year; this might eventually destroy the ship almost entirely.

While most of the scientific community considers that the destructive substance responsible for Vasa's long-term decay is sulfuric acid, Ulla Westermark, professor of wood technology at Luleå University of Technology, has proposed another mechanism with her colleague Börje Stenberg. Experiments done by Japanese researchers show that treating wood with PEG in an acidic environment can generate formic acid and eventually liquify the wood. Vasa was exposed to acidic water for more than three centuries, and therefore has a relatively low (acidic) pH. Samples taken from the ship indicate that formic acid is present, and that it could be one of the multiple causes of a suddenly accelerated rate of decomposition.

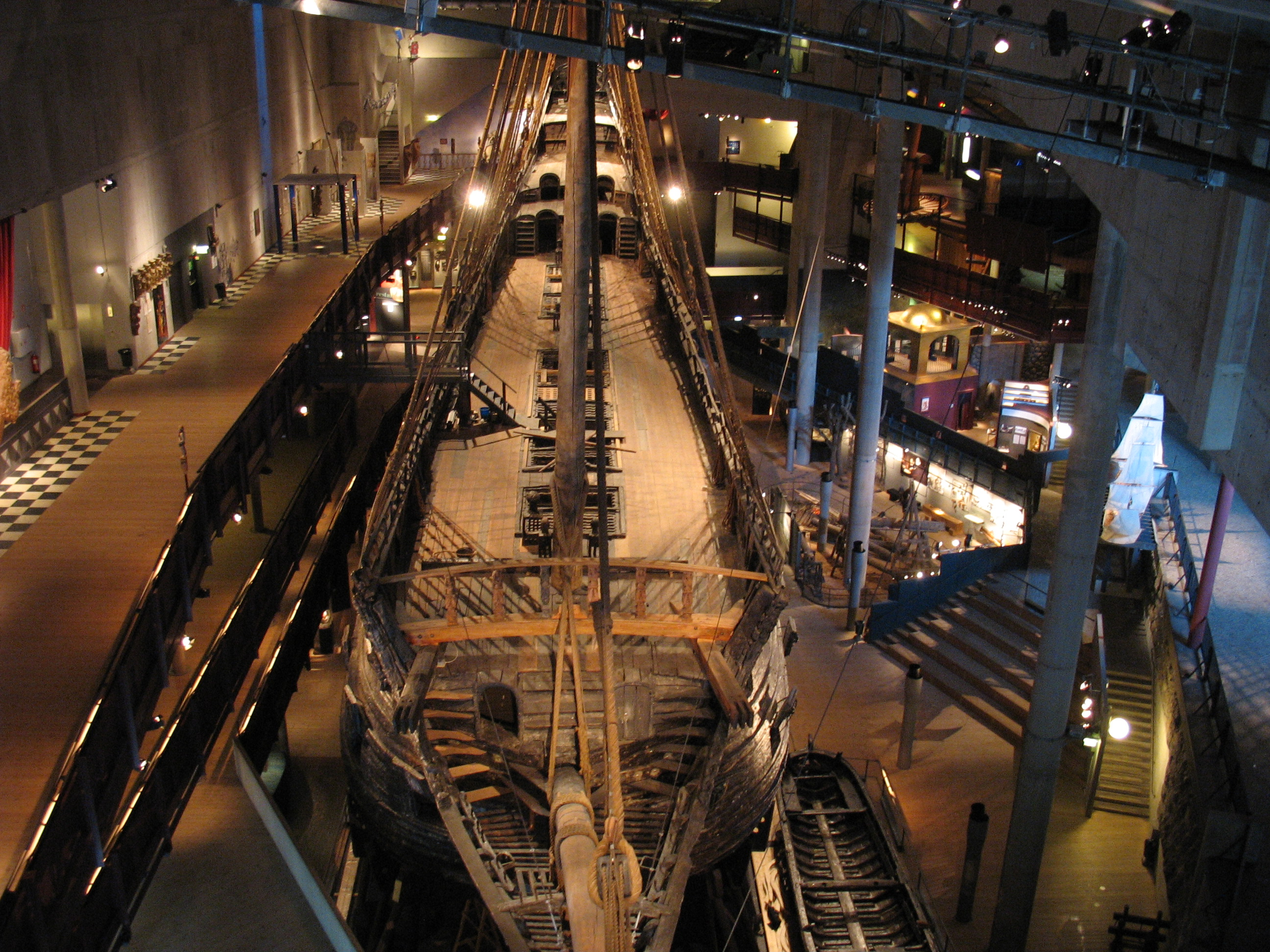
The preserved Vasa in the main hall of Vasa Museum seen from above the bow.

The museum is constantly monitoring the ship for damage caused by decay or warping of the wood. Ongoing research seeks the best way to preserve the ship for future generations and to analyze the existing material as closely as possible. A current problem is that the old oak of which the ship is built has lost a substantial amount of its original strength, and the cradle that supports the ship is not well suited to the distribution of weight and stress in the hull. "The amount of movement in the hull is worrying. If nothing is done, the ship will most likely capsize again", states Magnus Olofson from the Vasa Museum. An effort to secure Vasa for the future is under way, in cooperation with the Royal Institute of Technology and other institutions around the globe.

To deal with the problem of the inevitable deterioration of the ship, the main hall of the Vasa Museum is kept at a temperature of 18–20 °C (64–68 °F) and a humidity level of 53%. Different methods have been tried to slow destruction by acidic compounds. Small objects have been sealed in plastic containers filled with an inert atmosphere of nitrogen gas, to prevent further reactions between sulfides and oxygen. The ship herself has been treated with cloth saturated in a basic liquid to neutralize the low pH, but this is only a temporary solution as acid is continuously produced. The original bolts rusted away after the ship sank, but were replaced with modern ones that were galvanized and covered with epoxy resin. Despite this, the newer bolts also started to rust and were releasing iron into the wood, accelerating the deterioration.

Between 2011 and 2018, the Vasa Museum and the Swedish materials technology group Alleima undertook a long-term research and development project to replace the galvanised bolts with specially designed high alloy stainless steel substitutes, made up of eight components. The steel from which the replacement bolts were manufactured, designated as SAF 2707 HD, is corrosion-resistant, can withstand exposure to the harshest environments, and is normally used in the oil-and-gas industry.

The Museum announced at the end of 2023 that it would be building a replacement cradle and new internal support skeleton for the Vasa at a total cost of SEK 150 million. Funding was sought from donors and sponsors. Researching the project, and work on construction drawings, had already taken four years; test operations on full-scale models had also been carried out. The project itself, anticipated to take about a further four years, was scheduled to begin in spring 2024. A consequence of this work is that the interior of the ship will have many support structures added to it, so impairing the visual impression of the lower decks and interior spaces. Therefore a visual record has been made of the appearance of the inside of the ship before the start of this work.

== Legacy ==
Within 20 years of the sinking of Vasa, Sweden ceased using Dutch shipwrights and instead employed English expertise. Whilst it is suggested this change was due to King Karl X Gustav being impressed by an English-built ship that he saw, it is likely that the design processes used in English shipyards fitted better with the Swedish state as customer. In contrast to the older traditional methods used by the Dutch, English shipwrights put plans for a new ship on paper and built models for discussion with those paying for construction.

In the 20th century, Vasa became a popular and widely recognized symbol for a historical narrative about the Swedish stormaktstiden ("the Great Power-period") in the 17th century, and about the early development of a European nation state. Within the disciplines of history and maritime archaeology the wrecks of large warships from the 16th, 17th and 18th centuries have received particularly widespread attention as perceived symbols of past greatness of the state of Sweden. Among these wrecks, Vasa is the best-known example, and has become recognized internationally, not least through intentional use of the ship as a symbol for marketing Sweden abroad.

The name Vasa has in Sweden become synonymous with sunken vessels that are considered to be of great historical importance, and these are usually described, explained and valued in relation to Vasa herself. The Swedish maritime archaeologist Carl-Olof Cederlund, who has been active in the various Vasa-projects, has described the phenomenon as regalskepps-syndromet, "the royal ship syndrome" (after the term used in the 17th century for the largest warships in the Swedish navy). He associates the "syndrome" to a nationalist aspect of the history of ideas and traditional perceptions about hero-kings and glory through war.

The focus of this historical theory lies on the "great periods" in "our [Swedish] history" and shares many similarities with the nationalist views of the Viking Age in the Nordic countries and the praising of Greek and Roman Antiquity in the Western world in general. Cederlund has stressed the ritualized aspects of the widely publicized salvage in 1961 and has compared the modern Vasa Museum with "a temple in the Classical sense of the word". The placement of the museum on Djurgården, traditional crown property, and its focus on "the King's ship" has led him to suggest a description of it as "The Temple of the Royal Ship".

=== Literature and popular culture ===
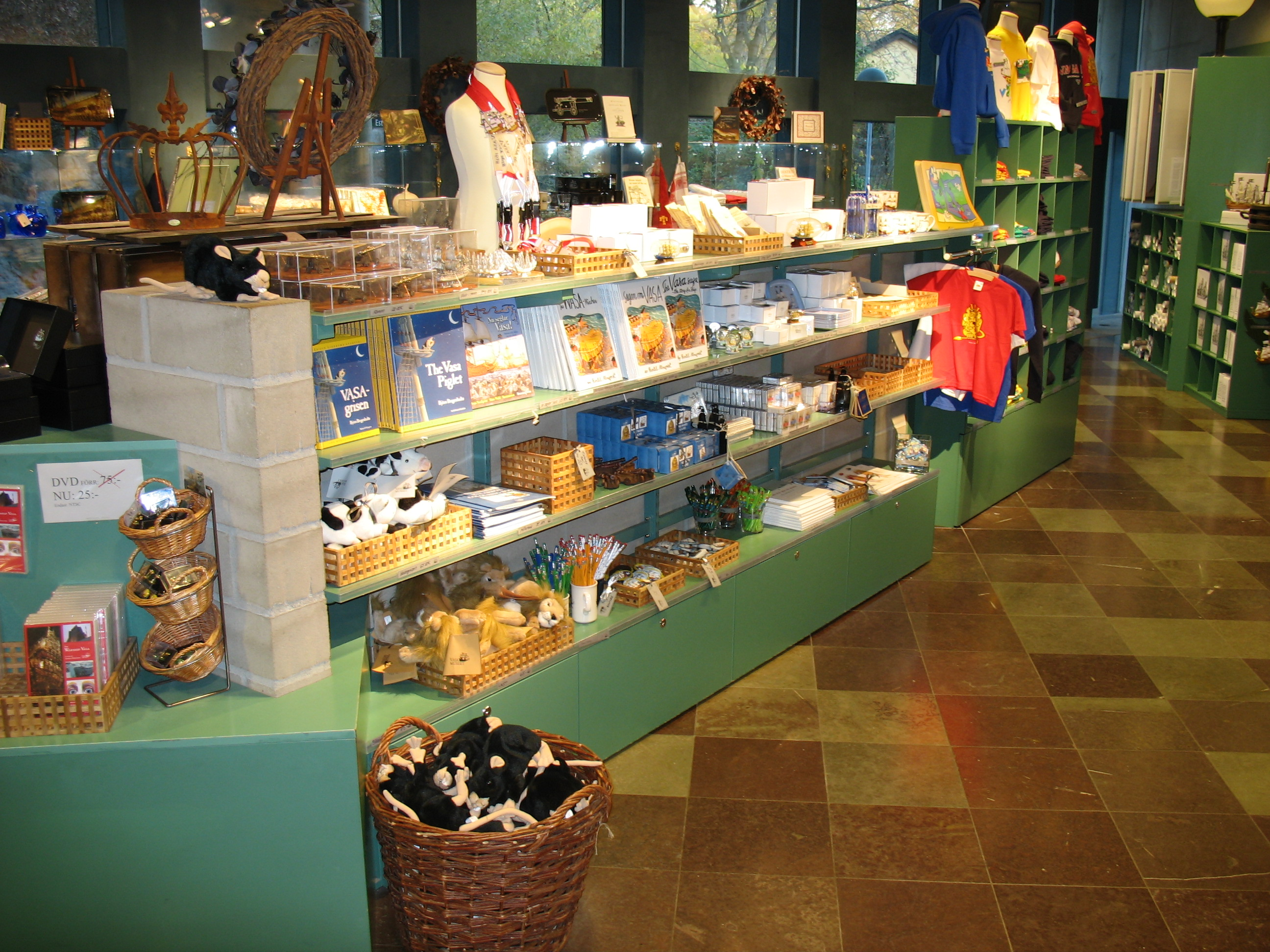
Merchandise and books based on Vasa on sale at the Vasa Museum gift shop in 2007

Vasa's unique status has drawn considerable attention and captured the imagination of more than two generations of scholars, tourists, model builders, and authors. Though historically unfounded, the popular perception of the building of the ship as a botched and disorganized affair (dubbed "the Vasa-syndrome") has been used by many authors of management literature as an educational example of how not to organize a successful business. In The Tender Ship, Manhattan Project engineer Arthur Squires used the Vasa story as an opening illustration of his thesis that governments are usually incompetent managers of technology projects.

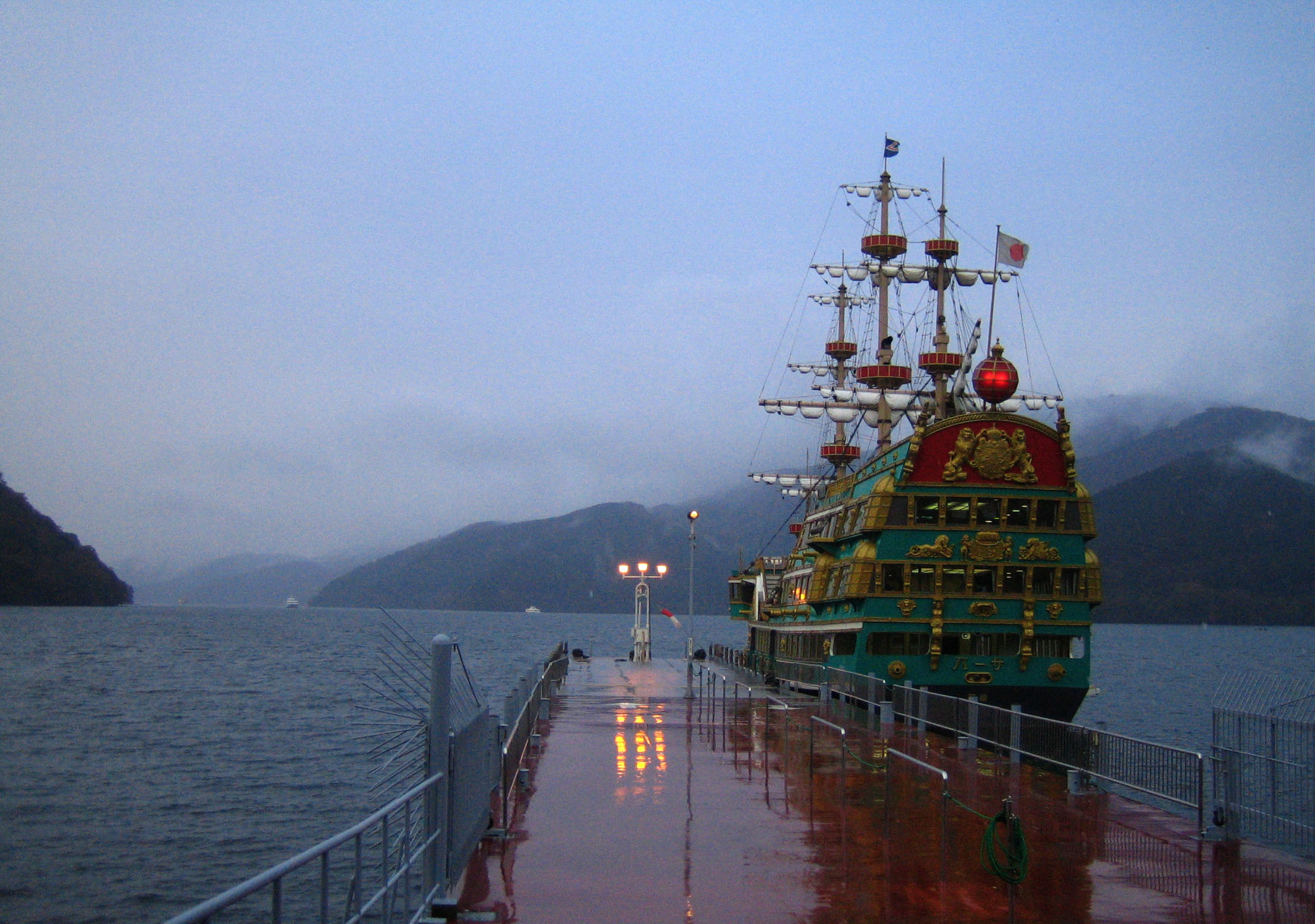
The Japanese sightseeing ship on Lake Ashi inspired by Vasa.

The Vasa Museum has co-sponsored two versions of a documentary about the history and recovery of the ship, both by documentary filmmaker Anders Wahlgren. The second version was shown in the museum and released on VHS and DVD with narration in 16 languages. In late 2011, a third Vasa-film premiered on Swedish television, with a longer running time and a considerably larger budget (with over 7.5 million kronor provided by SVT).

An educational computer game was made and is used in the museum and on its website to explain the fundamentals of 17th-century ship construction and stability. Several mass-produced model kits and countless custom-built models of the ship have been made. In 1991, a 308-tonne (303-long-ton; 340-short-ton) pastiche reproduction of the ship was built in Tokyo to serve as a 650-passenger sightseeing ship. Vasa has inspired many works of art, including a gilded Disney-themed parody of the pilaster sculptures on the ship's quarter galleries.

Being a popular tourist attraction, Vasa is used as a motif for various souvenir products such as T-shirts, mugs, refrigerator magnets, and posters. Commercially produced replicas of many of the objects found on the ship belonging to people on board, such as drinking glasses, plates, spoons, and even a backgammon game, have been made.

== See also ==
- Vasa Museum
- Batavia
- Kronan
- Mary Rose
- HMS Royal George
- List of world's largest wooden ships
