= Siege of Christianstad =

- Part of the Scanian War
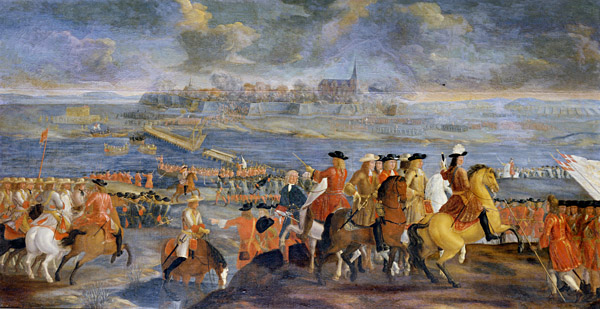
- Danish troops capture Christianstad by Claus Møinichen, 1686.
Date	10–15 August 1676
Location	Kristianstad, Scania, 56°01′46″N 14°09′24″E
Result	Danish victory

Belligerents
Denmark–Norway	(yes) Swedish Empire

Commanders and leaders
(Denmark–Norway) Christin V	(Swedish Empire) Christer Wulfklo (surrendered)

Strength
3,000 men	1,000 men 78 cannons

Casualties and losses
148 killed 392 wounded	300 killed 700 captured

The siege of Christianstad (Danish: Belejringen af Christianstad, Swedish: Belägringen av Kristianstad), also known as the Capture of Christianstad (Danish: Overtagelsen af Christianstad, Swedish: övertagandet av Kristianstad), was a siege conducted by Christian V of Denmark on the Swedish-held city of Christianstad (Kristianstad) from 10 to 15 August 1676 during the Scanian War. The besieged Swedes would eventually surrender, and Christianstad would be occupied until 1678.

== Background ==
Denmark declared war on Sweden in 1675 to regain the former territories it had lost in 1645 and 1658. The Danish king, Christian V, had successfully landed near Helsingborg and had begun marching through Scania, quickly seizing Helsingborg and Landskrona. The day before the surrender of the former fortress, the Swedish king, Charles XI, had been observed marching to Kristianstad. The Danish operation on Halmstad was forgotten in pursuit of the Swedish king. It was on the 13 of August that the Danish army marched to Kristianstad.

== Capture ==
The Danish troops decided to go to the undermanned newly constructed fort in Kristianstad. There they met the Swedish commander Christer Wulfklo with an army of about 1,000 men. The fortress was taken after 1 1/2 hours. Denmark lost 148 men and had 392 wounded, 24 of them were officers, with 4 of them dying. Sweden lost 300 men, with the rest of the army being captured.

== Aftermath ==
The Danish troops plundered the city with those who identified as Swedes or had loyalty to the Swedish king seeing the worst. The Danish troops left on the 17 August to assist in the conquest of Halmstad, leaving only a few battalions and garrisons.

Kristianstad was now in Danish hands again. However, the fortunes of war changed at the Battle of Lund on December 4, and at the Battle of Landskrona in July 14 the following year. The Danish garrison at Kristianstad then found themselves surrounded and had to endure a year-long siege before surrendering with free departure from Kristianstad on August 4, 1678.
