= Battle of Køge Bay (1677) =

1677 battle of the Scanian War 1677

- Part of the Scanian War
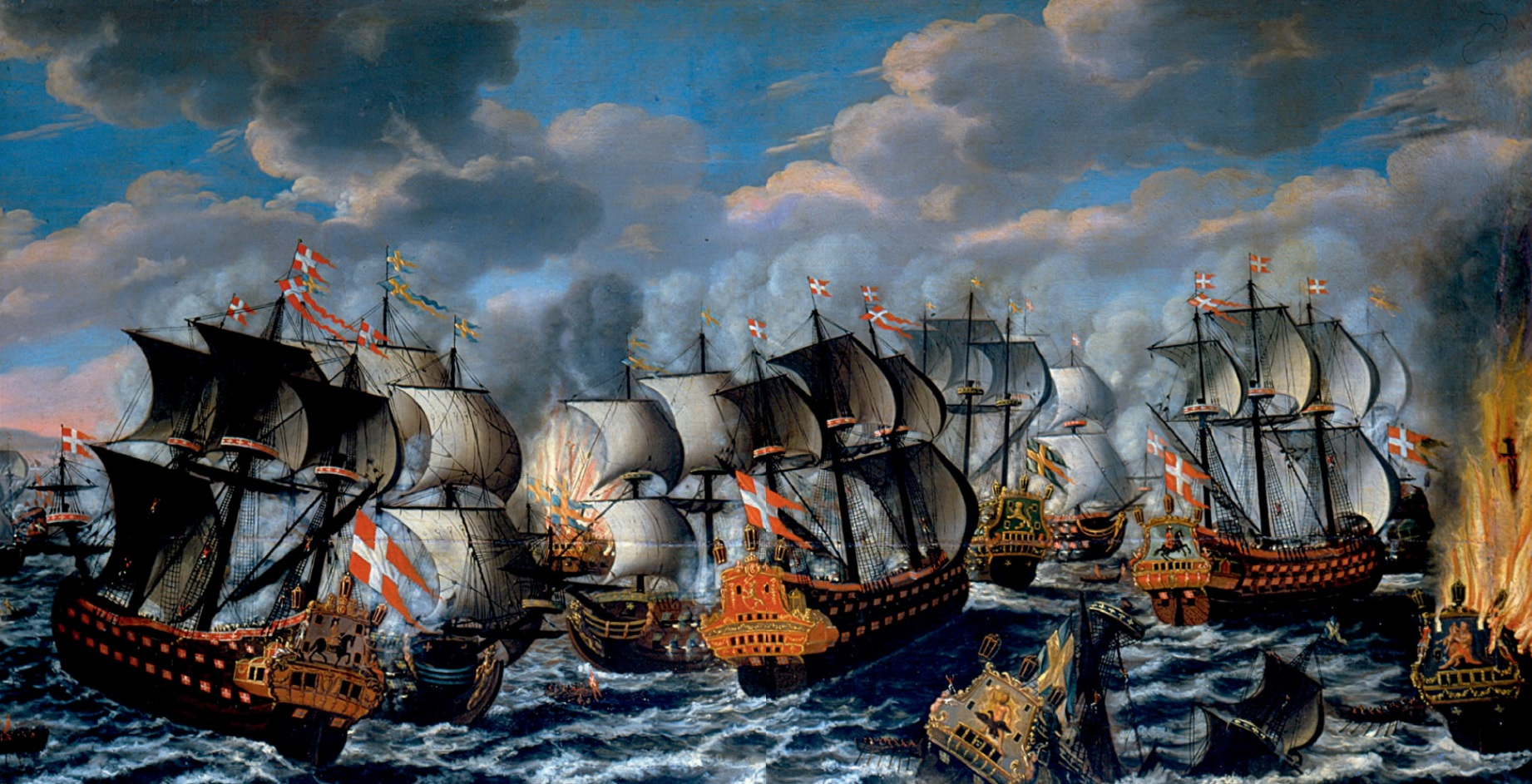
- Battle of Køge Bay; Claus Møinichen, 1686
Date	1–2 July 1677
Location	Køge Bay, Baltic Sea
Result	Danish victory

Belligerents
Denmark–Norway	(yes) Swedish Empire

Commanders and leaders
(Denmark–Norway) Niels Juel	(Swedish Empire) Henrik Horn

Strength
34 ships 6,700 men	45–47 ships 9,200 men

Casualties and losses
c. 275 wounded & 100 dead	20 ships c. 3,000 wounded, captured & dead

The Battle of Køge Bay was a naval battle between Denmark-Norway and Sweden that took place in the bay off of Køge 1–2 July 1677 during the Scanian War. The battle was a major success for Admiral Niels Juel after his previous victory one month earlier at the Battle of Møn, and is regarded as the greatest victory in Danish naval history.

== Background ==
Denmark, the Dutch Republic, Brandenburg and several German states were at war with Sweden and its allies as part of the larger Franco-Dutch War. After the defeat at the Battle of Fehrbellin against a Brandenburg army, Swedish possessions in northern Germany were under great pressure and in need of reinforcements. Attempts to relieve the southern Baltic provinces had failed and the Danish fleet had inflicted a stunning blow to the Swedish navy at the Battle of Öland in June 1676. The Swedish navy had lost three of its largest ships, Kronan, Svärdet and Äpplet, the Admiral of the Realm Lorentz Creutz and the experienced admiral Claas Uggla while the Danish fleet did not lose a single ship; the Danish navy had command of the Baltic for the remainder of that year. Denmark was able to prevent Sweden from reinforcing its German possessions, and at the same time was able to land a large army in Skåne to take the war to Swedish soil. The Swedish leadership under Charles XI managed to get the upper hand in the land war through the victories at Halmstad on 17 August and Lund on 4 December 1676. The Danish army under the leadership of Christian V had to retreat back to Landskrona and on 30 December, Helsingborg was recaptured by Swedish forces. Both sides needed to take control of the Baltic shipping lanes; the Danes to bolster their forces in Skåne and Sweden to relieve their possessions in northern Germany.

In Skåne, the Swedish and Danish armies came close to fighting a major battle at Rönneberga a few km north of Landskrona on 27 May 1677. The Swedish force was less than half the size of its Danish adversary and a battle was prevented only because the Danes were unaware of their advantage and called off an attack. Later that night, the Swedish generals convinced King Charles that the odds were hopeless and the Swedish army withdrew back to Kristianstad. Christian decided instead to attempt to seize Malmö, which was still in Swedish hands, to secure a base for his fleet. After a few weeks of siege, the Danes attempted to take the city by force on 25–26 June. The assault was beaten back with Danish losses of at least 3000 men and forced the Danes to retreat to Lund. Charles hoped that the success on land was followed up with a victory at sea, which would cut off supplies from the Danish army in Skåne and prevent it from evacuating back to Denmark.

Despite the defeat the previous year, the Swedish navy was in the Spring of 1677 still numerically superior to the Danish navy and posed a considerable threat. The Danish sea forces were reorganized off Zealand and the need to secure the sea lanes between Denmark and Skåne was of paramount importance. The Dutch allies of Denmark promised to send reinforcements. Cornelis Tromp, an experienced admiral who commanded the combined Dutch-Danish fleet the year before had been sent to speed up the arrangements, but would not reach Copenhagen until 2 July. The Swedish navy, on the other hand, had major difficulties securing supplies and equipment for its ships and were unable to recruit enough manpower.

Henrik Horn was appointed commander-in-chief of the Swedish navy in March 1677, becoming the third consecutive navy chief (after Gustaf Otto Stenbock and Lorentz Creutz) without any naval experience. The Danish fleet, on the other hand, was well-staffed with capable, experienced officers, which placed the Swedes at a marked disadvantage from the outset. Horn was quickly informed that Dutch reinforcements under Willem Bastiaensz Schepers were heading for the Baltic, and on 21 April he received orders from King Charles to join the main body of the Swedish fleet with a minor squadron anchored off Gothenburg under the command of Erik Sjöblad. The main fleet did not get to sea until early June, but Sjöblad nevertheless sailed as early as 20 May to join Horn. Sjöblad tried to sail through the Great Belt, but was becalmed for on the 23rd and did not pass Langeland until the 29th. At the battle of Møn, a superior Danish force won a decisive victory, sinking or capturing more than half of the Swedish vessels and taking Sjöblad prisoner.

== Prelude ==
After his victory, Juel repaired and re-supplied his ships and sent out patrols to scout south of Öland. On 17 June, he was informed that the Swedes planned to transport cavalry units from Pomerania to Skåne and sent out three frigates to search for transport ships. The scouting group returned on 21 June to report that they have been chased by Swedish ships and sighted a fleet of 30 warships and 15 supply vessels and fireships. The day after, a war council was held and the decision was made to sail out in force to cruise between Skåne and the island of Rügen, however the fleet was forced to sty off Stevns Peninsula due to unfavorable winds. There was some uncertainty whether to allow Juel to meet the Swedish force straight away, or to avoid battle and wait the arrival of Tromp and the reinforcements under Schepers. The original order was to engage the Swedish force directly, but the weather delay made Danish military leadership hesitant, especially Grand Chancellor Frederik Ahlefelt. At the same time, there were express orders from the King Christian to avoid battle. After his experiences facing the Swedish navy, Juel was convinced that there was little risk of defeat even against a numerically superior force. The Swedish main fleet had left its base on Dalarö, near Stockholm, on 9 June and two days later was joined off Öland by two ships from its Gothenburg squadron and the newly built 60-gun Kalmar. The Swedish Admiral Horn spent almost two weeks training his crews by cruising between the island of Bornholm and the Swedish mainland. On 24–30 June, the two fleets maneuvered in the Sound and south of Skåne and finally sighted each other between Stevns Klint and Falsterbo on the afternoon of 30 June.

== Battle ==
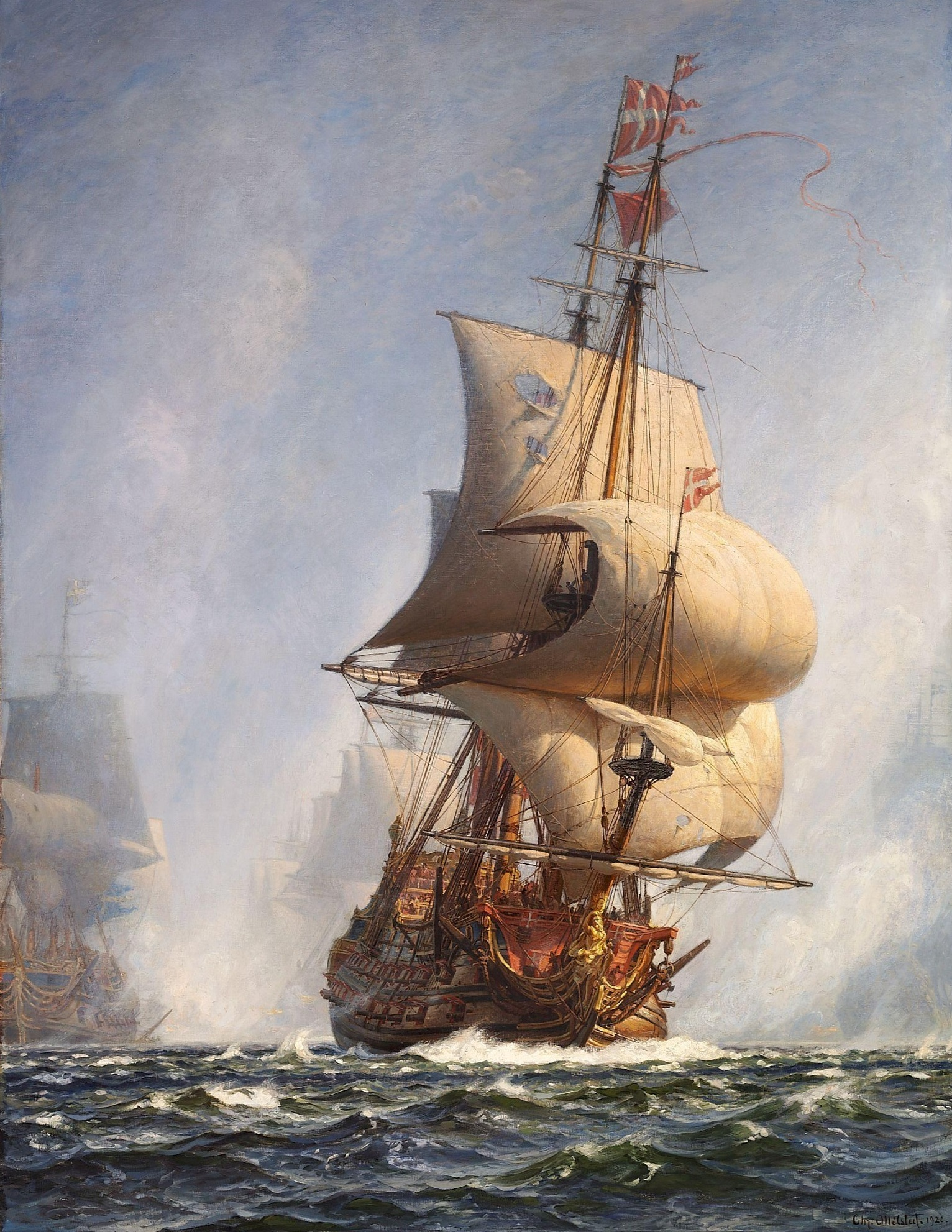
1920 painting of the battle by Christian Mølsted

The night between 30 June and 1 July, the Swedish formed up for attack. In the dark, the 64-gun S:t Hieronymus went aground and was not able to be dislodged to fight the following day. Early in the morning, both sides formed battle lines towards south-southwest between Stevns Klint and Falsterbo. At the head of the Swedish line was its thirds squadron headed by Wachtmeister, the first squadron under Horn in the middle and the second squadron under Clerck in the rear. There has been a debate among historians about the order of the squadrons in the Danish line, but it was positioned north of the Swedish line and blocked the path through the Sound. Horn chose to attempt to sail westwards rather than attacking despite outnumbering Juel with 29 warships to 17. His intent was to cut off the Danes from their bases on Zealand. During the race towards the coast that ensued, the two forces exchange gun fire and Horn attempted to disrupt the Danish line by attacking with a fireship. Juel's men managed to tow the fireship away with a longboat and one of the minor supply vessels.

At Stevns Klint, the Swedish 66-gun Draken ran aground and was forced to surrender after facing heavy gun fire from several Danish ships, including Juel's own 58-gun flagship Christianus V. The flagship was so badly damaged during the battle that Juel had to move his flag to the 64-gun Fridericus III in Markor Rodsteen's squadron and when this ship also suffered damage, moved on to the 64-gun Charlotta Amalia. When the forces approach the coast, the Swedish line turned north and both fleets sailed parallel to each other into the Sound.

Around midday, off the village of Højerup on Stevns Klint, Wachtmeister in the Swedish lead squadron sighted a force of eight large warships and relayed this to Horn. What he had sighted was Rodsteen's squadron that had moved further to the north under cover of a dense fog of gunpowder smoke. Horn wrongly believed that Rodsteen's squadron was still left somewhere in the gunsmoke and assumed that the Dutch reinforcements under Schepers had arrived. To avoid battle with what he believed would be a superior force, he decided to make an evasive maneuver. Horn let Wachtmeister continue north to attack what he believed were Dutch reinforcements while the rest of the Swedish force turned east-southeast, the position where he thought Rodsteen's squadron was located.

Juel's at first joined battled with Wachtmeister, men then set course for the main Swedish force together with Rodsteen's third squadron when he noticed that Horn was heading eastwards. When the Danes moved in on the Swedish line, they did not turn parallel to it, but instead chose to cut off Clerck's squadron, which was behind Horn. A the same time, Rodsteen sailed up on the other side of cut-off squadron, subjecting them to fire from both sides. Horn's squadron turned to relieve Clerck's squadron and a violent gun duel ensued. The outmaneuvered Swedish force was not able to put up an effective defense, and both the 72-gun Mars and the 60-gun Caesar were captured.

== Aftermath ==
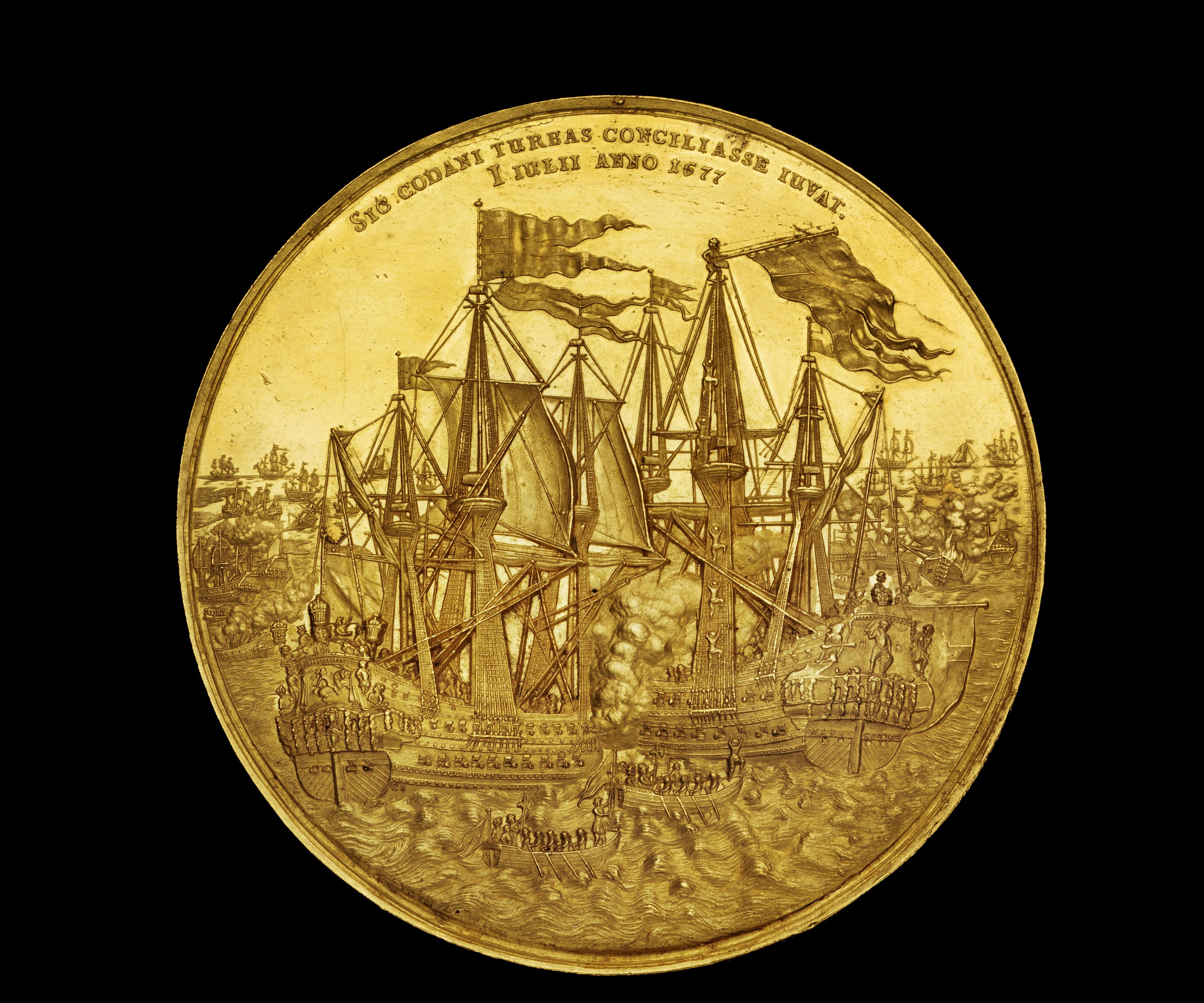
Gold medal struck in 1677 to commemorate the Danish victory from the collections of the National Museum of Denmark; the medal depicts the Swedish Caesar being captured and having her colors struck

The battle was a decisive victory for Denmark and an embarrassing defeat for Sweden. At the price of only about 100 dead, 275 wounded and no ships lost, the Danish fleet had inflicted over 3,000 Swedish casualties. The Swedes lost six large warships, an armed merchant, a large frigate, two fireships and a bojort. The defeat of the Swedish fleet also gave Denmark-Norway control of the Baltic sea, and thereby the inner supply lines of the Swedish Empire. The combined Dano-Dutch fleet, now under Tromp, was ordered to "burn and defile, plunder, kill or abduct the people", with the intention of luring Swedish troops away from Scania and thus relieve the land-bound operations. To the displeasure of Tromp and Schepers, who considered such a method of warfare foreign and unworthy of a Dutchman. Although Öland and parts of the coast of Småland were devastated, King Charles XI did not move any forces from main front in Scania. During the remainder of the war, Denmark completely dominated at sea, even after the Netherlands made peace with Sweden in 1678. The Swedish fleet avoided further confrontations and could no longer maintain the line of communication with Swedish Pomerania; the last Swedish troops, on Rügen capitulated to Brandenburg in December 1678.

Juel's order to turn into the Swedish line, cutting it in two, rather than going up parallel to it has been the subject of extensive discussion among military historians. During the 19th century, Danish and Norwegian naval historians interpreted it as a groundbreaking tactical innovation that had a major impact on tactical doctrine at the time. In their opinion, Juel had innovated the concept of "breaking the line" a century before it was used by Admiral George Rodney is his decisive victory against a French fleet in the Battle of the Saintes in 1782, during the American Revolutionary War. More recent historians have questioned previous conclusions of Juel's maneuvers and pointed to the fact that contemporary sea officers were well aware of the advantages of breaking an opponent's line, but had still not developed the degree of discipline, cohesion and organization required to allow the tactic to be applied consistently and reliably.

== Force ==
The Swedish fleet had clear superiority in numbers of ships, guns and men. The Swedish force had 30 large and medium warships, 6 fireships and 11 lesser support ships. Altogether it was equipped with 1,650 guns and 9,200 men. The Danish force had 35 warships, 2 fireships and 7 support ships with a total of 1,400 guns. Several Danish ships were undermanned and the total manpower was only 6,700. However, some of the Swedish ships were not purpose-built warships but rather armed merchants. In terms of leadership and quality of crew, the Danish force had a clear superiority.

The figures in parentheses is the number of guns according to existing sources. Fireships were regular ships repurposed to be set on fire and floated toward enemy ships to set them aflame or force them to scatter.

=== Danish fleet ===
1. squadron

Admiral's ship: Anna Sophia (58), Markor Rodsteen

- Lindormen (50)
- Norske Løve (86)
- Fredericus Tertius (52)
- Christianus IV (54)
- Hammeren (40)
- Delmenhorst (50)
- Havmanden (30)
- Bonte Falk (18)
- Bon Eventyr (4)
- Norske Løve (4)
- Grønne Jager (4) (fireship)

2. squadron

Flagship: Christianus V (80), Niels Juel

- Christiansand (40)
- Churprinsen (74)
- Enighed (62)
- Neptunus (40)
- Maria (30)
- Tre Løver (58)
- Havfruen (30)
- Postillionen (18)
- Kg. David (10)
- Venus (4)
- Forgyldte Fisk (8) (fireship)

3. Squadron

Admiral's ship: Tre Croner (68), Jens Rodsten

- Svanen (58)
- Gyldenløve (56)
- Lossen (30)
- Christiania (54)
- Nellebladet (62)
- Charlotta Amalia (58)
- Hvide Falk (30)
- Svenske Falk (40)
- Unge Prins (?)
- Kleine Jæger (6)
- St. Johannes (4)
- Diana (4)

=== Swedish fleet ===
1. squadron

Flagship: Victoria (80), Henrik Horn

- Wrangel (60)
- Saturnus (64)
- Mars (72)
- Carolus (60)
- Wismar (54)
- Flygande Vargen (44, armed merchant)
- Riga (54)
- Hjorten (36)
- Fredrika Amalia (34)
- Trumslagaren (34, armed merchant)
- Elisabeth (12, armed merchant)
- Mjöhunden (10, supply vessel)
- Ekorren (8 eller 12, supply vessel)
- Råbocken (8, supply vessel)
- S:t Johannes (4, bojort)
- (Danske Kaparn) S:t Jakob (6, bojort)
- Druvan (fireship)

2. squadron

Admiral's ship: Solen (74), Hans Clerck

- Venus (64)
- Merkurius (64)
- Herkules (56)
- Svenska Lejonet (48)
- Spes (48)
- Gripen (8, lastdragare)
- Fenix (36)
- Konung David (32, armed merchant)
- Pärlan (18, armed merchant)
- Laurentius (8, boer)
- Måsan/Måsen (4, bojort)
- Laurentius (8, bojort)
- (Lilla) Fortuna (10, bojort)
- Björnen (10, fireship)
- S:t Johannes (4, fireship)

3. squadron

Admiral's ship: Nyckeln (84), Hans Wachtmeister

- Jupiter (70)
- Draken (66)
- Hieronymus (64)
- Caesar (60)
- Göteborg (48)
- Maria (44)
- (Kompani)Solen (32, armed merchant)
- Salvator (30)
- Kompanifalken/Förgyllda Falken (10, bojort)
- Gröna Draken/Caparen (8, bojort)
- Sjömannen (4, bojort)
- Sjöman (8, supply vessel)
- Svan (fireship)
- Leoparden (fireship)

"Attached later in the battle"

- Kalmar (60)
- Andromeda (50)
- Gustavus (44)
