= Battle of Møn =

1677 naval battle

- Part of Scanian War
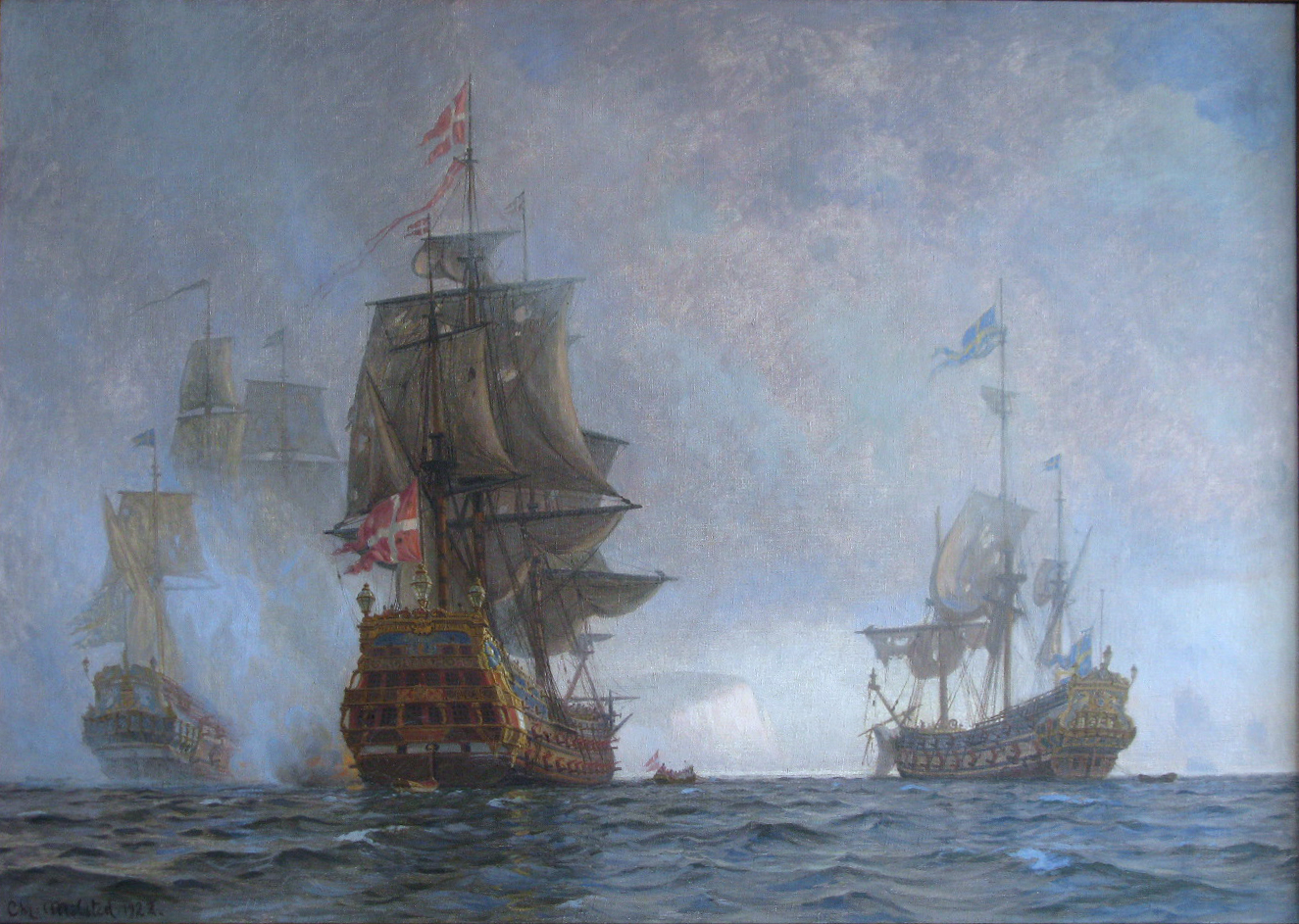
- Battle of Møns Klint by Christian Mølsted
Date	31 May 1677
Location	between Møn and the coast of northern Germany
Result	Dano–Norwegian victory

Belligerents
(yes) Swedish Empire	Denmark–Norway

Commanders and leaders
(Swedish Empire) Erik Sjöblad	(Denmark–Norway) Niels Juel

Strength
3 men of war 5 armed merchants 4 minor vessels 394 guns	13 men of war 670 guns

Casualties and losses
8 ships at least 1,500 dead, wounded or missing	Negligible

The Battle of Møn, also known as the Battle of Fehmarn, took place 31 May–1 June 1677, as part of the Scanian War. A smaller Swedish squadron under Admiral Erik Sjöblad attempted to sail from Gothenburg to join the main Swedish fleet in the Baltic Sea. It was intercepted by a superior Danish-Norwegian force under Niels Juel and decimated over the course of two days. The Swedes lost 8 ships and over 1,500 men dead, injured or captured, including Admiral Sjöblad himself, while the Danish losses were insignificant.

The victory prevented the Swedish navy from concentrating its forces and provided valuable prize ships for the Danish navy. It confirmed Danish supremacy at sea during the war and laid the ground for the major Danish-Norwegian victory at Køge Bay 1–2 July that same year.

== Prelude ==
Henrik Horn was appointed commander-in-chief of the Swedish navy in March 1677, becoming the third consecutive navy chief (after Gustaf Otto Stenbock and Lorentz Creutz) without any naval experience. The Danish fleet, on the other hand, was well-staffed with capable, experienced officers, which placed the Swedes at a marked disadvantage from the outset. Horn was quickly informed that Dutch reinforcements under Tromp were heading for the Baltic, and on 21 April he was received orders from King Charles to join the main body of the Swedish fleet with a minor squadron anchored off Gothenburg under the command of Erik Sjöblad. The main fleet did not get to sea until early June, but Sjöblad nevertheless sailed as early as 20 May to join Horn. Sjöblad tried to sail through the Great Belt, but was becalmed for on the 23rd and did not pass Langeland until the 29th. Danish admiral Niels Juel, victor of the battles of Bornholm and Öland in 1676 was already at sea with 13 large warships, a yacht and two fireships when he received the report on Sjöblad's position on 28 May; within two days, the two fleets had sighted one another.

The Danish force was superior in numbers, armament and quality of equipment. Sjöblad's force had nine ships to Juel's 13, eight of which had 50 or more guns. The Danish ships were also dedicated warships while the Swedish vessels were armed merchants and less suited for battle. In total, the Swedes had 394 guns while the Danes had nearly 670, and the heaviest guns on the Swedish sides were merely 12-pounders, a relatively light caliber for naval artillery.

== Battle ==
Juel had taken up a position between the Swedish squadron and the outlet between the German mainland and the island of Falster. After a war council on 30 May, the Swedish force decided to attempt to sail around the Danish force and set a course for east-northeast on 31 May. The wind abated once more that day and both sides began towing their ships to make headway. The Swedish force tried to stay in formation by setting the pace by the slowest ships, and later that afternoon, the first Danish ships came within firing range. Before night fell, Drejer of Enigheden managed to overtake and capture Wrangel Palats. During the night, the wind picked up once more, which was to Juel's benefit.

On the morning of 1 June, the Danish force had the wind at their backs (the weather gauge) and could rake Sjöblad's force with their heavier guns while still keeping out of range of the lighter Swedish artillery. Since the wind was too light for coordinated maneuvers, Juel gave orders for every captain to attack the nearest enemy ship to sink or capture them. By 4 o'clock, Juel's flagship Christianus V had caught up with Sjöblad's Amarant and after an intense artillery duel that lasted two hours, the Swedish flagships lost a yard and had its largest topsail shot to pieces. Per Rosenlund of the Andromeda tried to turn around to assist his admiral, but his crew refused to follow orders since they "did not want to go back and let themselves be slaughtered like sheep". Sjöblad had to surrender and was taken prisoner. Kalmar Kastell was attacked by four Danish ships and also struck its colors. The captain of the Swedish ship, Cornelis Thijssen, gave his artillery officer orders to shoot up the ship's hull, and the Danish boarding party had to quickly ground the ship at Falster, later only managing to salvage the guns and the rig.

One after the other, the Swedish ships came under attack: Havsfrun and Ängeln Gabriel were both overtaken while the rest of the fleet managed to escape. Rosen and five smaller ships tried to turn back to Gothenburg through Öresund. Rosen hoisted the English flag and managed to deceive the Danish land defenses, but two others were captured. Only Andromeda, the badly damaged Gustavus and one fireship managed to escape into the Baltic to join with the Swedish main fleet south of Öland.

== Aftermath ==
The captured Swedish ships and the prisoners were brought to Copenhagen. Sjöblad was exchanged for Danish prisoners on 15 August and was given command of Gothenburg's defenses. The Danish losses were limited to damage on some of the ships — the mainmast of Churprinsen broke during the battle — while the losses in men were very low. On Juel's flagship there was only one death and two injuries reported. However, Juel was not satisfied with the behavior of some of his subordinates and court martialed several. Five of his captains were accused of violating orders or showing lack of discipline. One was completely exonerated, while the others were convicted for disciplinary offenses and fined or had their pay reduced.

The Danish-Norwegian victory had thwarted the Swedish attempt to concentrate their forces. Juel avoided having to fight a much larger Swedish fleet and managed to give the Danish navy a welcome addition of ships. The Swedish losses, on the other hand, were over 1,500 wounded, injured or captured. The defeat weakened the Swedish fleet while strengthening the Danes. Exactly one month later, the two main fleets met at the Battle of Køge Bay, an engagement which would become the greatest Danish victory at sea and which would raise Niel Juel to hero status.

== Ships ==
The numbers in parentheses indicates the number of guns for each ship.

Danish fleet

Flagship: Christianus V (85), Niels Juel

- Churprindsen (74)
- Enighed (62)
- Gyldenløve (56)
- Nellebladet (52)
- Christianus IV (54)
- Christiania (54)
- Lindormen (50)
- Neptunus (42)
- Christiansand (40)
- Hommeren (37)
- Havmannen (34)
- Havfruen (30)

Swedish fleet

Flagship: Amarant (52), Erik Carlsson Sjöblad

- Andromeda (52)
- Wrangels Palats (38)
- Kalmar Kastell (72), armed merchant
- Ängeln Gabriel (44), armed merchant
- Havsfrun (44), armed merchant
- Rosen (44), armed merchant
- Gustavus (48), armed merchant
- (Lilla) Gripen (8-12), bojorts
- Diana, Venus (yachts)
- S:t David och two unnamed ships (fireships)
