= HDMS Fredericus Tertius =

Hdms Fredericus Tertius was a third-rate ship of the line of the Royal Dano-Norwegian Navy, launched at Copenhagen in 1673. She participated in the 1677 Battle of Køge Bay,

== Construction and design ==
Fredericus Tettius was laid down at the Royal Dockyards on Gammelholm in Copenhagen in 1672. She was named for Frederick III, who had died in May 1670. She was launched in 1673. Her complement was 391 men. Her armament was 50 guns.

== Career ==
Sje was under the command of captain Ivar Hoppe during her participation in the 1677 Battle of Køge Bay, which took place in the bay off of Køge 1–2 July 1677 during the Scanian War. The battle was a major success for Admiral Niels Juel and is regarded as the greatest victory in Danish naval history. During the early hours of the battle, Niels Juel's flagship, Christianus Quintus, was so badly damaged that he had to move his flag to Fredericus Tertius.

Later in the same year, on the way back to Copenhagen from Rügen, still under the command of Hoppe and with Christian V on board, she was caught in a storm. Christian V had the small anchor which saved her from wrecking gilded and installed on a magnet in the ceiling of his Kunstkammer.

In 1713–1714, she was under the command of captain Floris Friis. She wrecked on off Bergen 8 April 1714 on route between the Shetland Islands and Norway.

== Legacy ==
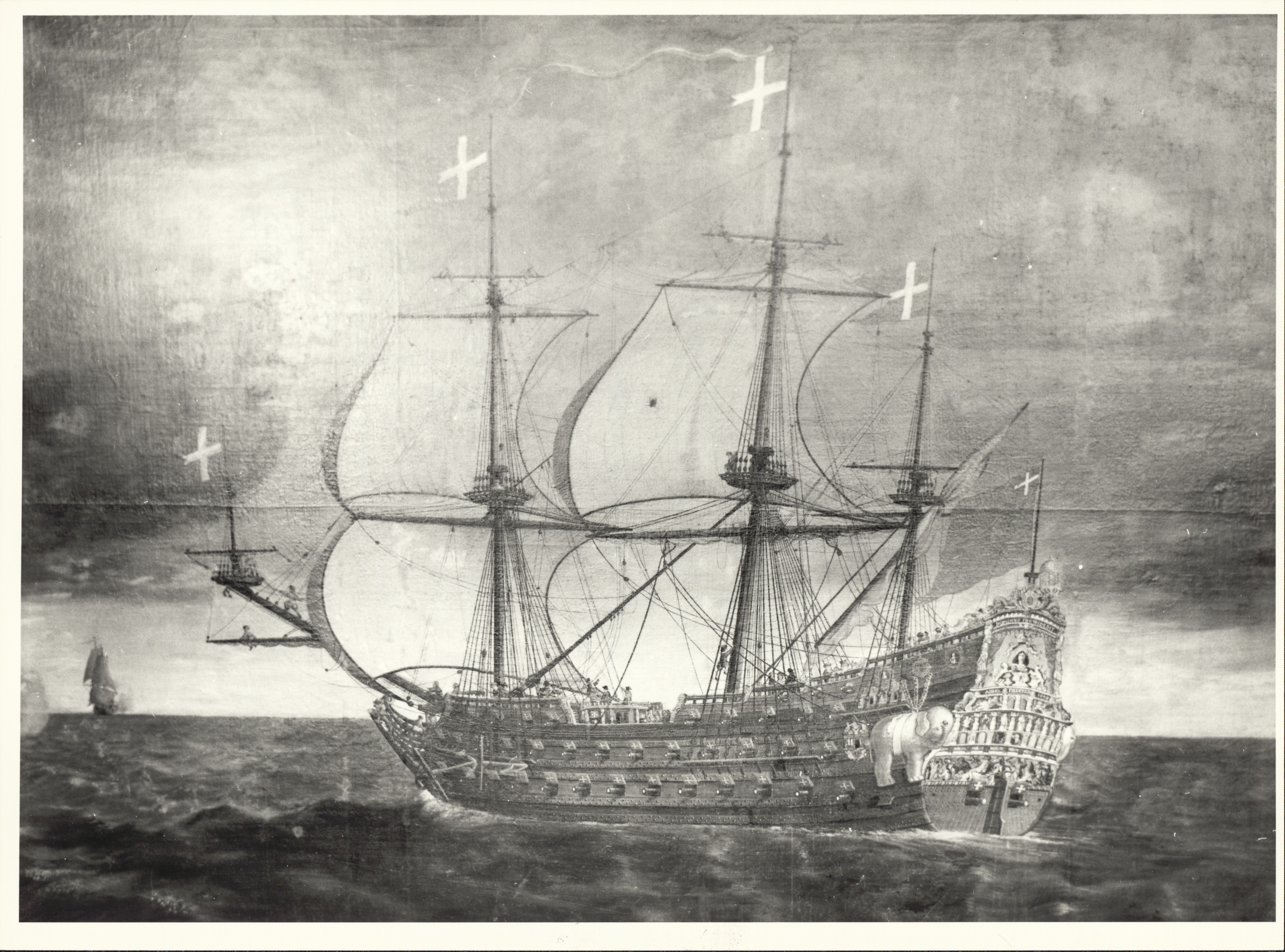
Painting of HDMS Friderich at Gavnø, often incorrectly referred to as the Fredericus Tertius.

Christian V's gilded anchor from the ship is now part of the RoYal Oldenburg Collections at Rosenborg Castle. The anchor is accompanied by a poem by Thomas Kingo which provides an account of the events. A painting Of a Danish naVal ship at Gavnø Castle is often claimed to be of Fredericus Tertius. Niels M. Probst has pointed out that it must in fact depict an older ship, hDMS Friederich, built 1649.
