= Invasion of Gotland (1676) =

Danish invasion of Gotland in 1676

- Part of the Scanian War
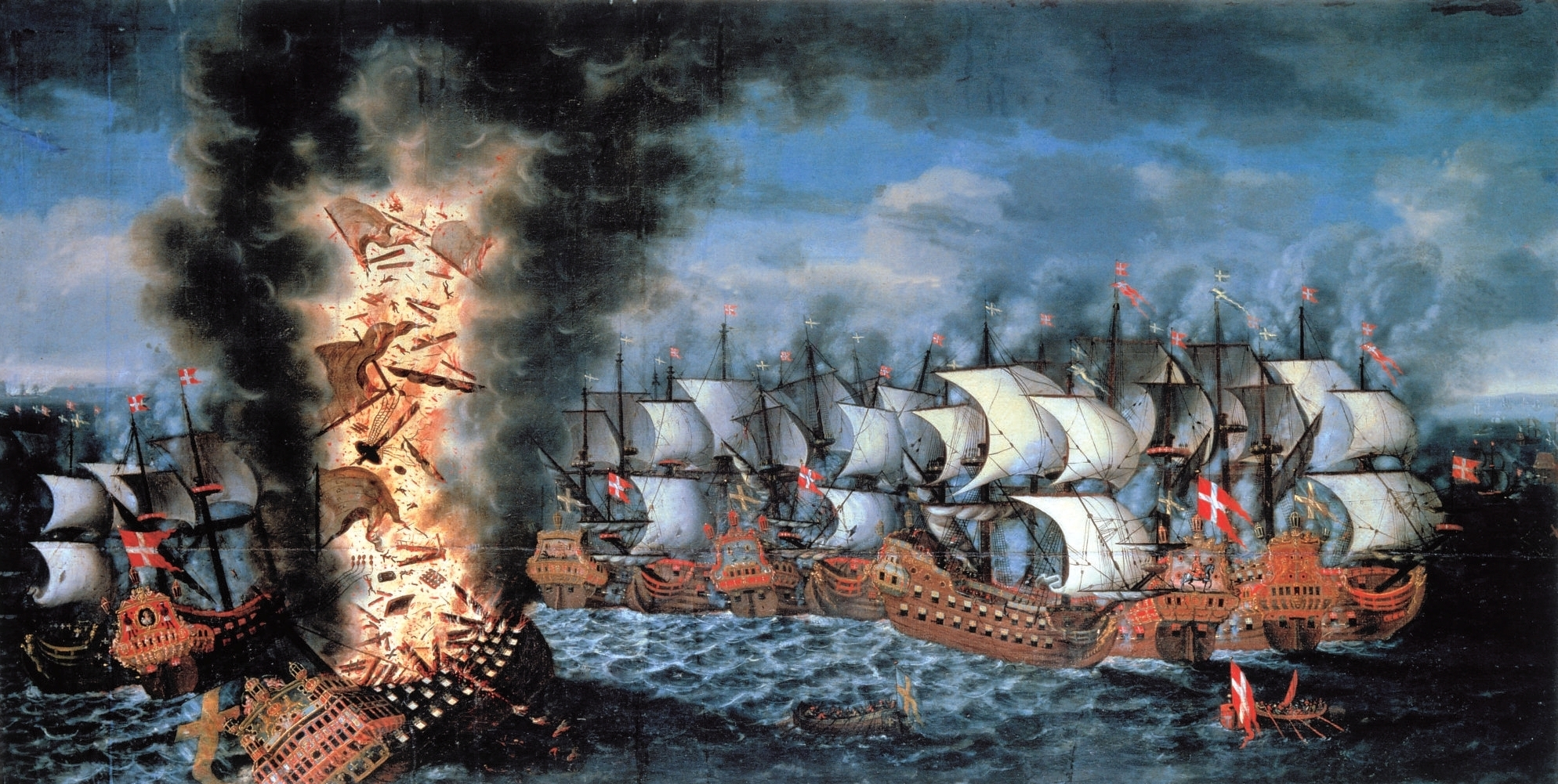
- The vessel Svärdet blowing up
Date	28 April 1676 – 1 May 1676
Location	Gotland, Sweden
Result	Danish victory
Territorial changes	Gotland occupied by Denmark until 1679

Belligerents
Denmark-Norway	(yes) Swedish Empire

Commanders and leaders
(Denmark–Norway) Niels Juel (Denmark–Norway) Martin Barthold (Denmark–Norway) Peter Morsing	(Swedish Empire) Gabriel Oxenstjerna (Swedish Empire) Michael Schultz

Units involved
(Denmark–Norway) Gylden-løve (Denmark–Norway) Delmenhorst (Denmark–Norway) Havfruen	(Swedish Empire) Carlshamn (Swedish Empire) Charitas

Strength
529 men (Visborg); 628 guns 8 liners 5 frigates 3 smaller ships 2 lighters 2 Galiots Total: 20 ships	600 men At least two ships

Casualties and losses
Unknown but few	Unknown but few, 2 ships

The Invasion of Gotland (Danish: Erobringen af Gotland/Gulland (Note: In Danish and Swedish, "tl" became "ll", and this gave the island the name Gulland in the Danish period. Today's Swedish name for the island, Gotland, comes from Low German.); Swedish: Erövringen av Gotland) was a Danish sea-borne invasion of the Swedish island of Gotland in the Baltic Sea, led by admiral Niels Juel during the Scanian War. The invasion took place from 28 April to 1 May 1676.

Gotland was occupied by Denmark until 1679, when the war was formally ended.

== Background ==
=== Administrative history ===
During the early Middle Ages the island was semi-independent but de jure under the Swedish crown. Visby, the largest city on the island was an important Hanseatic city. In 1361, Valdemar Atterdag of Denmark invaded the island, thus confirming Danish sovereignty for the first time.

Denmark later bought the island from the Teutonic Order in 1408, and retook the island from Eric of Pomerania in 1449, and from then on ruled by Danish governors.

=== Background to the invasion ===
A Danish squadron of 16 warships, led by Niels Juel, were originally to be sent from Copenhagen to Gotland, but when the squadron left the port on 28 March, it could only count eight Liners, five Frigates, three smaller ships, two Burners and two Galiots with an additional 628 guns.

A grounding on Amager initially delayed the squadron. They first reached Rügen at Hiddensee, a then Swedish island. After taking some cattle, they left for Gotland.

On 22 April, they intercepted two Swedish warships between Bornholm and Hanö, they burned the ships, yet also took over the ships. After Juel had received intelligence, which indicated the island could be conquered, his squadron landed near Visby which was defended by 600 men.

== Action ==
Col. Barthold landed his troops, with coverage of his ships cannon fire, near Visby. The Swedish governor concentrated his troop at the Danish landing place, but they suffered greatly by the cannon fire. Barthold met only weak resistance, thanks to the important help of the cannons, whereby the Swedish troops retreated back to Visby.

Some Gotlanders, which had 30 years prior had been a part of Denmark, were celebrating the invasion, and helped them open the Visby city gates by horses. This meant further retreatment to Visborg by the Swedes. Juel, had Rear admiral, Peter Morsing, to fire at Visborg with the three ships of Gylden-løve, Delmenhorst and Havfruen. Yet on the same day the Swedish commander of Visborg capitulated.

== Aftermath ==
Eight days after the conquest, Niels Juel became governor of Gotland, while major Bilenberg were commander at Visborg with 529 men. A Danish battalion were also established in the beginning of June 1676, and three companies with 600 men each, were conscripted among the islands population

== See also ==
- Battle of Visby – 1361 battle in what is now Sweden
- Battle of Öland – 1676 naval battle of the Scanian War
- Peter Tordenskjold – Royal Dano-Norwegian Navy officer (1690–1720)
- Scania – Province in Sweden
- Gutes – Population of the island of Gotland
- Visby – Place in Gotland, Sweden
