= Markor Rodsteen =

Danish naval officer (1625–1681)

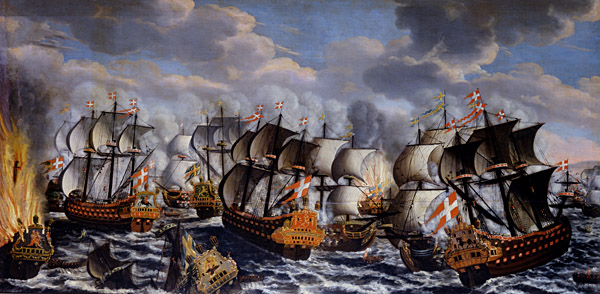
A painting by Claus Møinichen depicting the Battle of Køge Bay in 1677

Markor (Markvor, Marquard. Marcus) Rodsteen (31 October 1625 – 13 May 1681) was a Danish naval officer who reached the rank of admiral in the Royal Dano-Norwegian Navy. He is above all remembered for his role in the Køge Bay in which he commanded the avant garde squadron. After his retirement from the navy, he served as county governor of Skanderborg County.

== Early life and education ==
Rodsteen was born on 31 October 1625 at Hørbylund in Vendsyssel, the son of Forældre: Steen Rodsteen til Lerbæk og Elkær (died 1664) and Margrethe Lavesdatter Urne (died 1664).

== Career ==
In 1644–45, Rodsteen was an artillery lieutenant in Scania. In 1648–51, he went into foreign military service. After returning to Denmark, he returned to the artillery. In 1657, he was made a ship's captain and the commander of three ships leased in the Netherlands. The ships were first sent to Weseren and then to Gothenburg to participate in the blockade of the harbour. From there he continued to the Netherlands before arriving back in Copenhagen in September 1658. His next service was on board HDMS Trefoldigheden under the command of admiral Henrik Bielke. The ship participated in the Battle of the Øresund as well as the blockade of Landskrona. In 165_, he captained the ship of the line Tre Løver as part of admiral Helt's squadron in the Great Belt. In 1660, he returned to service on land at Arsenal with a rank of colonel lieutenant. 1670 saw him promoted to colonel.

In 1675, Rodsteen was promoted to admiral and appointed to the Danish Admiralty. In the same year, he was put in charge of a squadron in the Kattegat and North Sea. In 1787, when he was in command of another squadron, first in the Øresund and then in the Kattegat, he participated in another blockade of Gothenburg. The aim of the blockade was to support Ulrik Frederik Gyldenløve's campaign from Norway. During, the blockade, when HDMS Kjøbenhavn grounded, Rodsteen responded by setting the ship on fire to keep her from being captured by the Swedes. This prompted Gyldenløve to file a complaint to the king, who had Rodsteen replaced by Johan Wibe and sent back to Copenhagen. When Rodsteen explained the situation, he was acquitted of all charges. In 1788, he was put in charge of a squadron under admiral Niels Juel, on board HDMS Anna Sophia, participating in the Battle of Køge Bay on 1 July 1677. In 1678–78, still as commander of a squadron, he was sent to Rügen and Kalmar sund.

At the end of the war with Sweden, Rodsteen was dismissed from the navy. He was subsequently appointed county governor of Skanderborg County.

== Property ==
Rodsteen inherited Lerbæk from his father. In 1665, he also bought nearby Nørre Elkær. He also owned a large property on the north side of the Nyhavn canal in Copenhagen.

== Personal life ==
Rodsteen was married twice. His first wife was Dorothe Sehested (1637–1664), who was the widow of Peder Juel til Hundsbæk (1623–56). Her parents were chancellor Christian Thomesen Sehested (1590–1657) and Mette Rosenkrantz (1600–44). After her death, Rodsteen married secondly to Birgitte Reedtz (died 1699). She was the daughter of privy councillor Frederik Reedtz (1586–1659).

Rodsteen died on 13 May 1681, He was survived by two sons and a daughter. The elder son Christian Rodsteen, Rendsbord (1660–1728) was a military officer who reached the rank of general-lieutenant. He served as commandant of Rensborg. He died as the last male member of the Rodsteen family in 1728. The younger son Peter Rodsteen (1662–1714) served as county governor of Aalborg County. He was created a baron in 1704. The daughter Margrethe Markorsdatter Rodsteen (1664–1711) was married to Holger Eriksen Rosenkrantz (1657–1690).
