= Møinichen =

Møinichen is a surname. Notable people with the surname include:

- Claus Møinichen (1660–1726), Danish painter
- Erik Røring Møinichen (1797–1875), Norwegian politician
