= Beata Magdalena Wittenberg =

Swedish courtier (1644–1705)

Beata Magdalena Wittenberg (1644 – 1705) was a Swedish courtier.

She was the daughter of Count Arvid Wittenberg and Eva Margareta von Langen, and married riksråd Baron Henrik Horn in 1674.

In 1675, her husband assigned her a diplomatic mission to Hamburg. Her task was to secure the link between Sweden and its diplomats in Paris and London in connection to an ongoing transfer of funds, and to secure the transport of food to the city of Stade, which had yet to be sieged by Horn and the Swedish army. Reportedly, she developed "an activity worthy of respect on this post and managed to secure both funds and supplies to the disposition of her spouse".

She was widowed in 1693. In 1698, she followed Hedvig Sophia of Sweden to Gottorp after her marriage to Frederick IV, Duke of Holstein-Gottorp, and acted as her chief lady-in-waiting or Mistress of the Robes. During Hedvig Sophia's stay in Gottorp, Frederick regularly visited his lovers in Hamburg and also brought some of them to Gottorp. Wittenberg took Hedvig Sophia's side and became involved in a physical argument with a male courtier who acted as Frederick's pimp, an argument which ended with Wittenberg losing her wig and Hedvig Sophia's demand to return to Sweden. Hedwig Sophia and Beata Magdalena Wittenberg did return to Sweden not long after.
