= Niels Juel =

Danish naval officer (1629–1697)

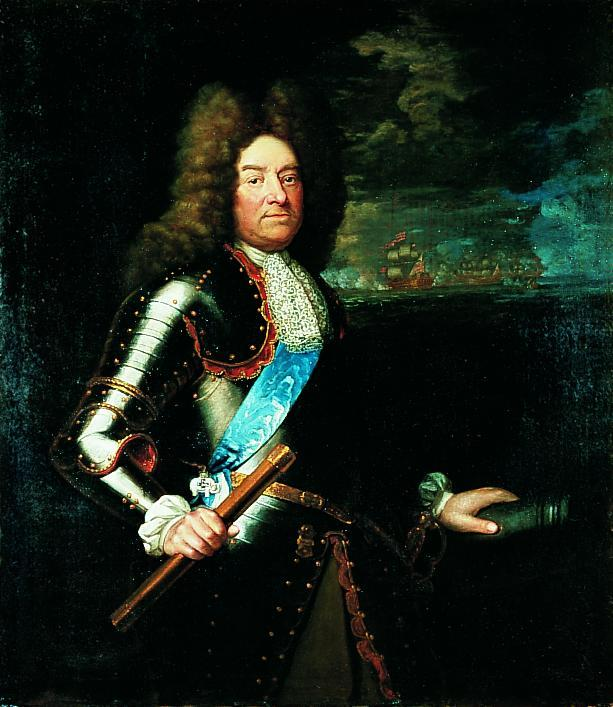
- Portrait of Juel by Jacob Coning
- Born: 8 May 1629; Christiania, Denmark–Norway
- Died: 8 April 1697 (aged 67); Copenhagen, Denmark–Norway
- Burial place: Holmen Church
- Relatives: Erik Juel (Father)
- Military career
- Allegiance: Denmark–Norway; Dutch Republic; Republic of Venice
- Branch: Royal Dano-Norwegian Navy; Dutch States Navy; Venetian navy
- Rank: Admiral (Denmark–Norway)
- Conflicts: First Anglo-Dutch War; Battle of Scheveningen; Second Northern War; Battle of Møn; Assault on Copenhagen; Cretan War (1645–1669); Scanian War; Invasion of Gotland; Battle of Bornholm; Battle of Öland; Landing at Ystad; Battle of Møn; Battle of Køge Bay; Invasion of Rügen
- Awards: Order of the Elephant Order of Dannebrog

Admiral Niels Juel (8 May 1629 – 8 April 1697) was a Danish naval officer who served as supreme commander of the Royal Dano-Norwegian Navy during the late 17th century and oversaw its development into a blue-water navy. His victory against Sweden at the Battle of Køge Bay (1677) is regarded as the greatest victory in Danish naval history. He also won, one month earlier, the Battle of Møn.

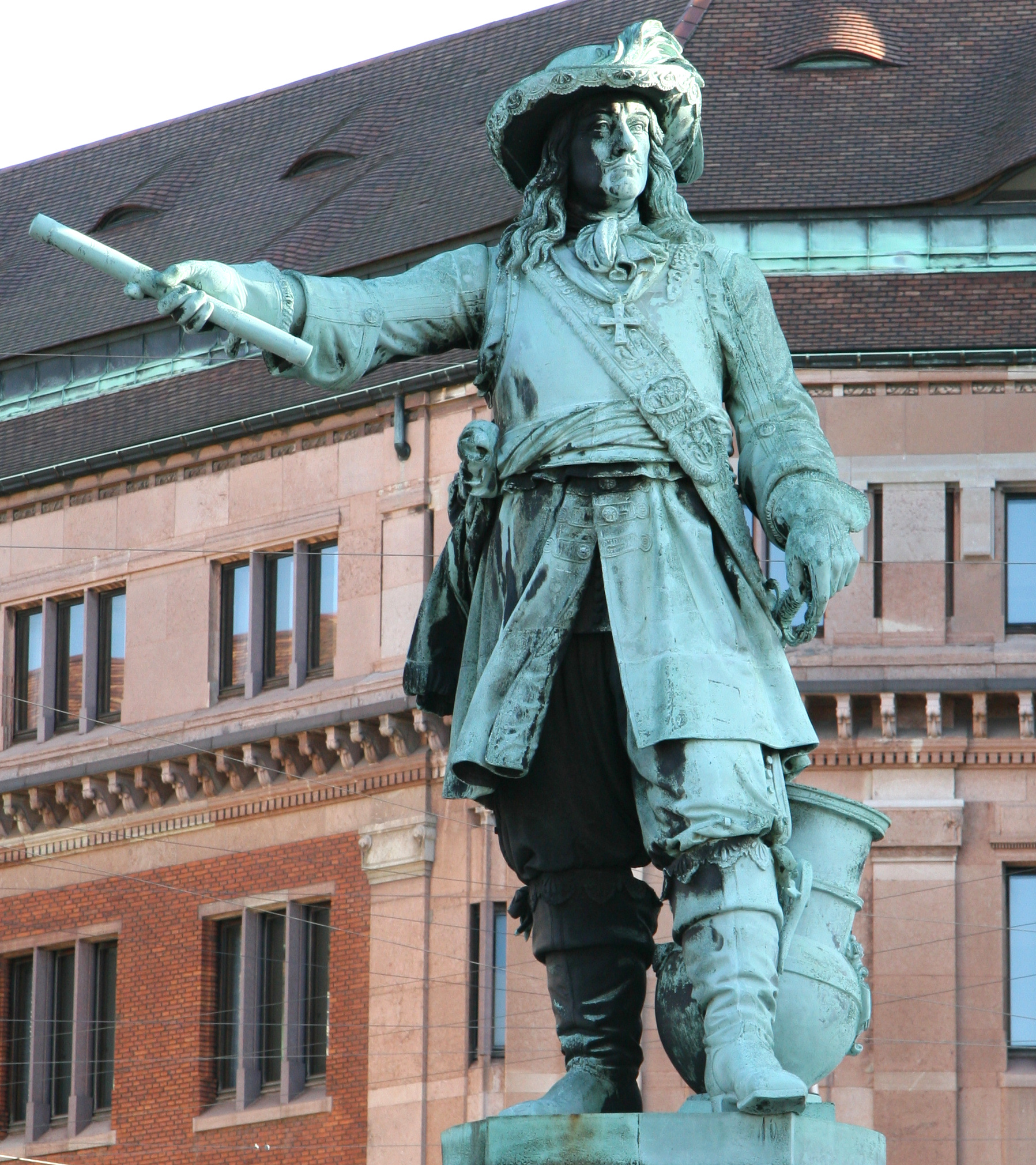
Niels Juel statue at Holmen Canal in Copenhagen

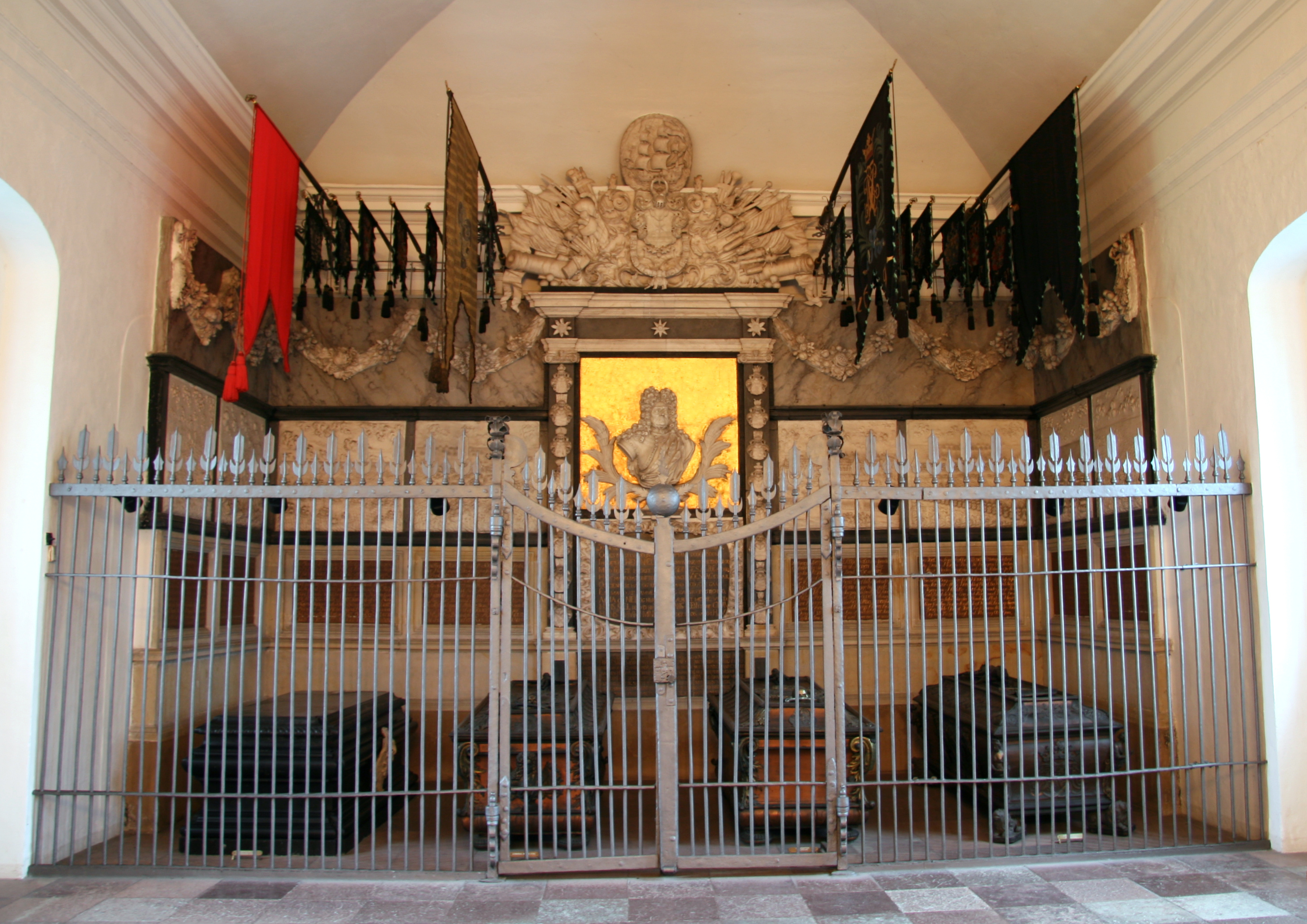
Niels Juel chapel at Holmen Church

== Background ==
Niels Juel was born the son of Erik Juel and Sophie Sehested, both of whom were descended from Danish nobility, who lived in Jutland where the father had a career as a local functionary and judge. He was the brother of the diplomat Jens Juel (1631–1700).

Niels Juel was born in Christiania (now Oslo), Norway, where his family sought refuge during the 1627 invasion of Jutland during the Thirty Years' War, while his father took part in the defense of the country at home. The following year after the occupation had ended, the family was reunited in Jutland. From 1635 to 1642, Juel was brought up by his aunt Karen Sehested (1606–1672) at the Stenalt estate near Randers.

== Career ==
In 1647, Juel was enrolled at the Sorø Academy. In 1652, Juel entered Dutch naval service. He served his naval apprenticeship under Dutch Admiral Maarten Tromp (1598–1653) and Dutch Admiral Michiel de Ruyter (1607–1676), taking part in all the major engagements of the First Anglo-Dutch War, a conflict between England and the Dutch Republic.

From 1654 to 1656, he attended Admiral Michiel de Ruyter on two trips to the Mediterranean during engagements against North African pirates. During an indisposition at Amsterdam in 1655–1656, he acquired a thorough knowledge of shipbuilding. In 1656, he returned to Copenhagen and entered Danish service as a naval officer, and in 1657, he was appointed admiral. He served with distinction during the Dano-Swedish War (1658–60) and took a prominent part in the defense of Copenhagen against the forces of King Charles X of Sweden.

During fifteen years of peace, Juel, as admiral of the fleet, labored assiduously to develop and improve the Royal Dano-Norwegian Navy, though he bitterly resented the setting over his head in 1663 of Vice-Admiral Cort Adeler (1622–1675), on his return from service to the Republic of Venice during the Turkish wars. In 1675, at the outbreak of the Scanian War, he served at first under Adeler, but on the death of the latter in November 1675, he was appointed to the supreme command.

Juel then won a European reputation, and raised Danish sea-power to unprecedented eminence, by the system of naval tactics, which consisted of cutting off a part of the enemy's force and concentrating the whole attack on it. He first employed this maneuver at the Battle of Jasmund off Rügen (25 May 1676) when he broke through the enemy's line in close column and cut off five of their ships, despite nightfall prevented him from pursuing them. Juel's operations were considerably hampered at this period by the conduct of his auxiliary, Dutch Lieutenant Admiral Philips van Almonde (1644–1711), who accused the Danish admiral of cowardice. A few days after the battle of Jasmund, Dutch Admiral Cornelis Tromp (1629–1691) with 17 fresh Danish and Dutch ships of the line, superseded Juel in the supreme command. Juel took a leading part in Cornelis Tromp's great victory off Battle of Öland (1 June 1676), which enabled the Danes to invade Scania unopposed.

On 1 June 1677, Juel defeated the Swedish admiral Erik Carlsson Sjöblad (1647–1725) during the Battle of Møn. On 30 June 1677, he won his greatest victory, in the Battle of Køge Bay southwest of Copenhagen. With 25 ships of the line and 1267 guns, he routed the Swedish admiral Henrik Horn (1618–1693) with 36 ships of the line and 1800 guns. For this triumph, the reward of superior seamanship and strategy at an early stage of the engagement, Juel's experienced eye told him that the wind in the course of the day would shift from S.W. to W. and he took risks accordingly; he was made lieutenant admiral general and a privy councilor. This victory, besides permanently crippling the Swedish navy, gave the Danes the self-confidence to become less dependent on their Dutch allies.

In 1678, Cornelis Tromp was discharged by King Christian V, who gave the supreme command to Juel. In spring 1678, Juel put to sea with 84 ships carrying 2,400 cannon, but as the Swedes were no longer had the naval strength to engage such a formidable fleet on the open sea, his operations were limited to blockading the Swedish ports and transporting troops to Rügen. After the Treaty of Lund in 1679, Juel showed himself an administrator and reformer of the first order, and under his energetic supervision the Danish navy ultimately reached imposing dimensions, especially after Juel became chief of the admiralty in 1683.

== Personal life ==
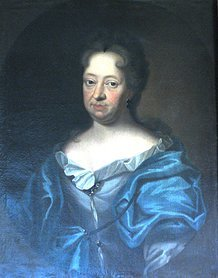
Margrethe Ulfeldt

Juel was married to Margrethe Ulfeldt (1641–1703) in 1661. She was the daughter of nobleman Knud Ulfeldt (1609–1657) and Vibeke Podebusk (1608–1645). She was betrothed to him after her father died when she was 20, he was 30 years old. She gave birth to their four children between 1664 and 1672.

In 1674, Juel was awarded a Danish knighthood. In 1678, he was granted title to Valdemar's Castle (Danish: Valdemars Slot) on the island of Tåsinge. He died on 8 April 1697, aged 67. He and his wife were buried in the Niels Juel chapel at the Holmen Church in Copenhagen.

== See also ==
- Statue of Niels Juel
- HDMS Niels Juel

== Other sources ==
- Barfod, Jørgen H. (1977) Niels Juel: A Danish Admiral of the 17th century (Marinehistorisk Selskab)

== Related reading ==
- Barfod, Jørgen H. (1997) Niels Juels flåde. (Gyldendal, Copenhagen) ISBN 87-00-30226-0 (in Danish)
- Probst, Niels M. (2005) Niels Juel: vor største flådefører (Statens Forsvarshistoriske Museum) ISBN 87-89022-46-7 (in Danish)
