= Erik Carlsson Sjöblad =

Swedish governor, admiral. and baron (1647-1725)

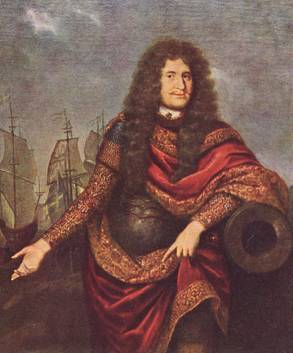
- Born: August 28, 1647; Halmstad, Halland, Sweden
- Died: May 31, 1725 (aged 77); Gothenburg, Västergötland, Sweden
- Military career
- Allegiance: Sweden
- Branch: Royal Navy
- Rank: Admiral
- Conflicts: Action of 31 May 1677
- Other work: Governor

Erik Carlsson Sjöblad (August 28, 1647 – May 31, 1725) was a Swedish governor, admiral, and baron.

== Early life ==
Sjöblad was born in Halmstad, Halland, Sweden. His father, a general, was Baron Carol Sjöblad Nilsson (1611–1696); his mother was Maria Eriksdotter Stierna (1614–1686).

== Career ==
Sjöblad began his military career in 1664 at the age of 17, when he took a post in the English fleet. After nine years he returned to Sweden, now as captain. In the Swedish admiralty, he rose quickly in rank, and in 1676, he was appointed admiral, when only 29 years old.

In 1677, he led his squadron against the Dano-Norwegian admiral Niels Juel. The Action of 31 May 1677 ended with Sjöblad's loss of 1,500 men and his ship Amara Then, and he became a prisoner of war. After the Scanian War ended, he was appointed Governor of Blekinge in 1683. He was owner of Herrestad in 1696.

In 1700, he took over the post of Governor of Gothenburg and Bohuslän, built as a port and depot for the Royal Navy.

Sjöblad soon proved to be an arbitrary county manager, and was described by a contemporary writer as "in every inch a despot." After the magistrate had collected together evidence of his irregularities, including diversion of Crown resources and income, Sjöblad was summoned to the National Council of Stockholm. He was brought to trial, accused of "several difficult goals af self-interest, abuse and self-readiness." In October 1711, he was sentenced to lose his posts, "life, honor and goods". The death penalty was repealed later and converted into a prison sentence. After the death of Charles XII, Sjöblad was restored to his titles by Queen Ulrika Eleonora in 1719.

== Personal life ==
Sjoblad married Charlotta Regina Palbitski (born 1663) in 1681. They had three children, a son, Carl Georg Siöblad, and two daughters, Ulrika Maria Eriksdotter Sjöblad (died 1758) and Charlotte Christina Sjöblad (died 1771).

He died in 1725 in Gothenburg, Västergötland, Sweden.
