= Claus Møinichen =

Danish painter

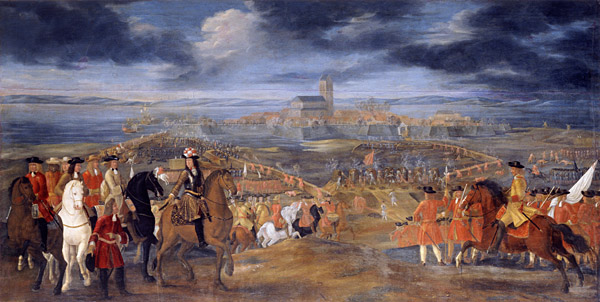
Battle of Landskrona 1676

Claus Møinichen or Claus á Møinichen (c. 1660 in Copenhagen – probably after 1726) was a Danish painter. He was the son of the Copenhagen surgeon Sixtus Møinichen (1629–1666) and his wife Anna Thiesens.

Little is known about him. He designed ornaments for the edition of the 'kongeloven' published in 1709. He also produced portraits of Frederick IV of Denmark, Kirsten Bille, Berte Skeel and others, as well as producing images of scenes from Ovid's Metamorphoses for the king. From 1686 to 1688 he painted the audience chamber at Frederiksborg Castle with scenes from the Scanian War.

He married Cathrine Frederiksdatter Fohlmann before 1703 and the couple had several children. Records show he was still alive in 1726 and – though his date of death is not recorded – he probably died soon after this.

== Works ==
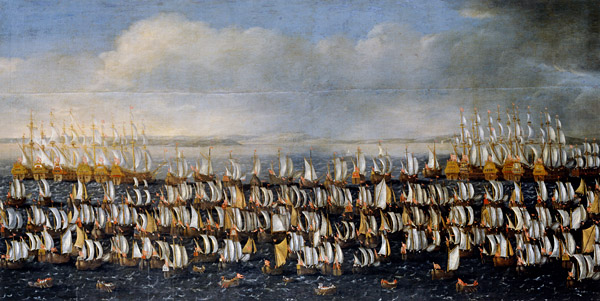
Danish invasion fleet

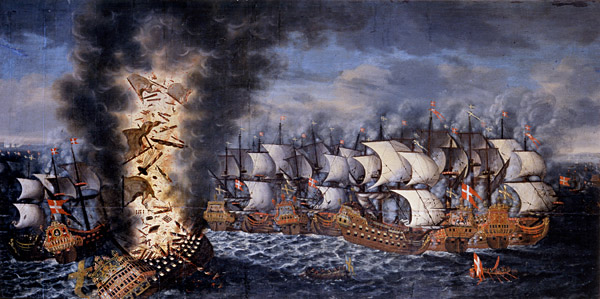
Battle of Öland

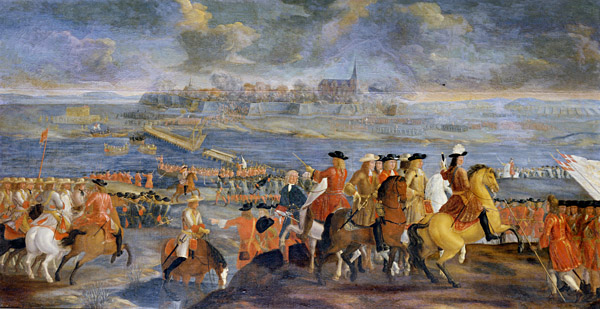
Capture of Kristianstad

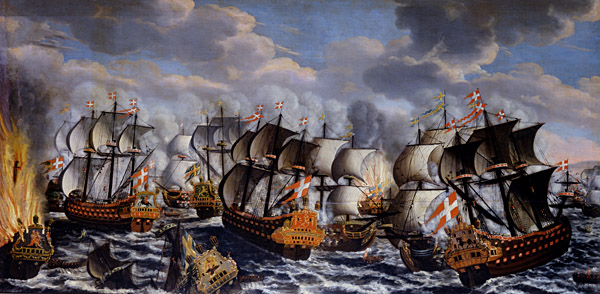
Battle of Køge Bay

== Sources ==
- Chr. Bruun: Frederik Rostgaard og hans Samtid I, 137 ff
- Weilbach: Nyt Kunstnerlexikon.
- F. J. Meiers Biography, 1st edition of the Dansk biografisk leksikon, tillige omfattende Norge for tidsrummet 1537–1814, Udgivet af C. F. Bricka, 19 bd, Gyldendal, 1887–1905
