= Bojort =

A bojort is a type of ship first used by the Dutch for transport in the shallow canals in the Netherlands and Flanders. From the 17th to 19th century, Kristinehamn was Bergslagen's most important shipping route. The iron from Bergslagen was transported over Vänern to the oceans via Gothenburg. Because of this, Kristinehamn got a royal charter in 1642 from Queen Christina of Sweden's guardian regency and to remind the people of the importance of the shipping, a bojort was included in the coat of arms, which today can be seen in the coat of arms of the Kristinehamn Municipality. Vänersborg Municipality's coat of arms also features a bojort.

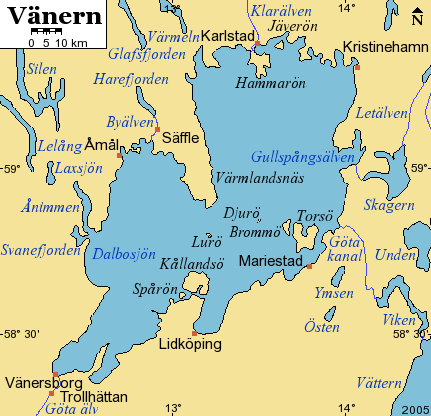
Detail map of Vänern with surroundings

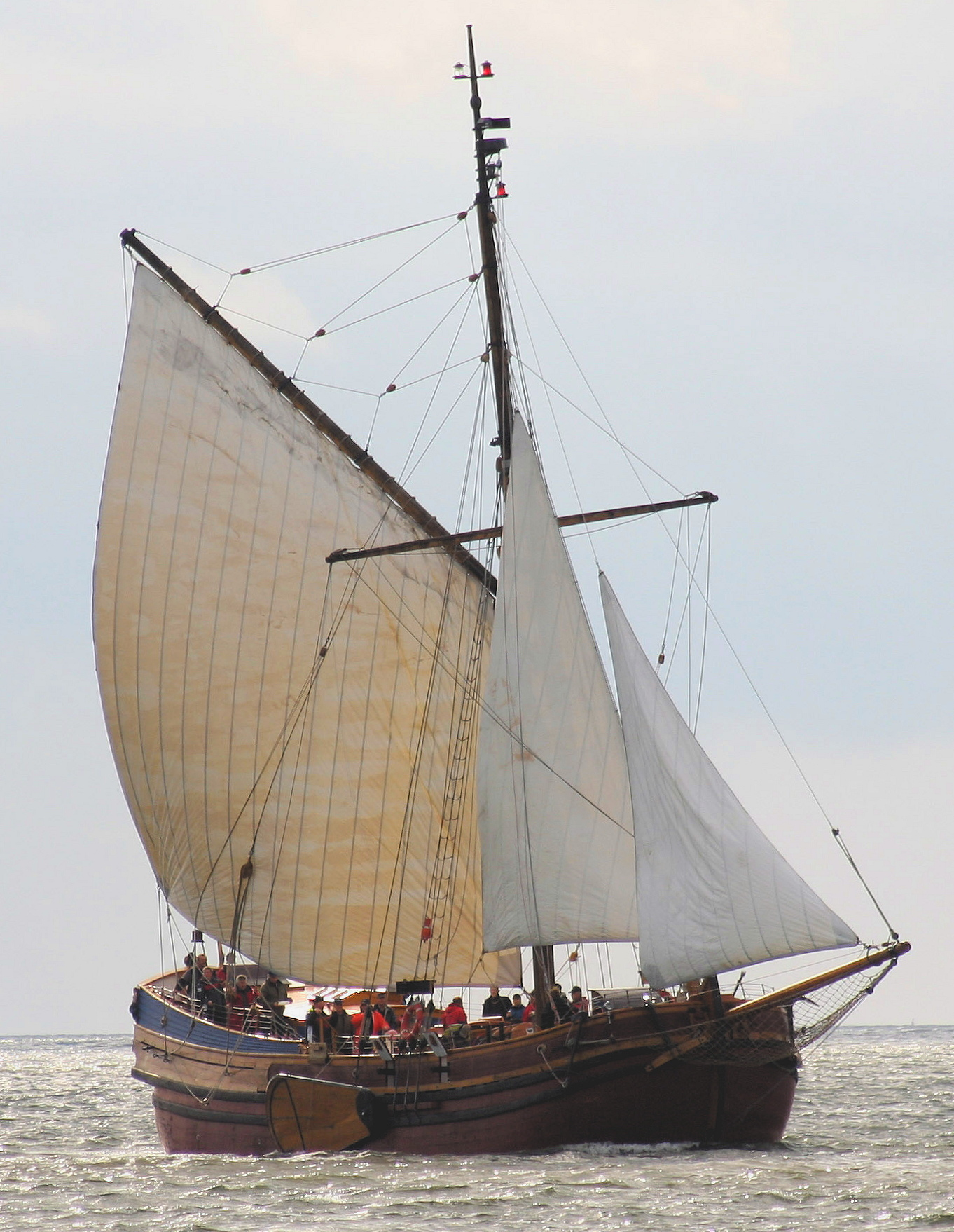
Christine af Bro, a modern bojort

Kristinehamn Municipality's coat of arms

Vänersborg Municipality's coat of arms
