= Henrik Horn =

Swedish nobleman and admiral (1618–1693)

Count Henrik Horn
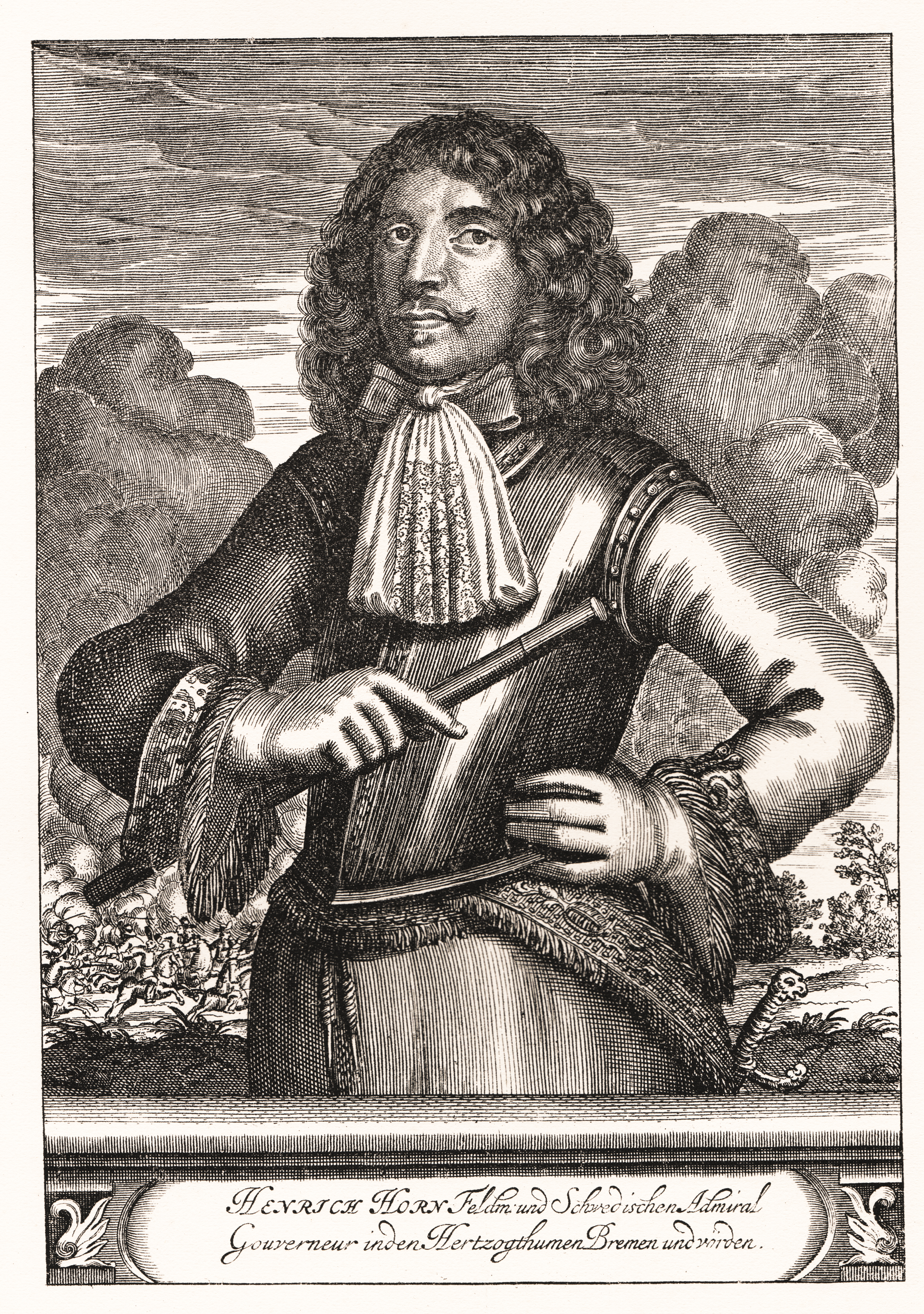
- Engraving by C. Hagen
- Born: May 22, 1618; Stade, Prince-Archbishopric of Bremen
- Died: February 22, 1693 (aged 74)
- Military career
- Allegiance: Sweden
- Rank: Field Marshal

Count Henrik Horn af Marienborg (22 May 1618 – 22 February 1693) was a Swedish nobleman (friherre), admiral and member of the Privy Council of Sweden.

== Biography ==
Henrik Horn was born at Stade in the Prince-Archbishopric of Bremen, today in Lower Saxony, Germany, into a Swedish noble family of medieval origin. He was the son of Henrik Horn (1578–1618) and was born two months after the father's death. During his youth, the city of Stade came under the rule of Sweden possession in 1628. Stade was held by the Danish from 1636 until reverting to Swedish control in 1643. Horn received a military education and pursued a military career in the service of the Royal Swedish Army. At the age of 25, he was appointed Colonel. Horn became Major General in 1654, General Lieutenant and Chief of the Finnish Army in 1657 and Field Marshal in 1665. He distinguished himself in the Polish campaign and in 1666 was appointed Governor-General of Bremen-Verden which was under a Personal union with Sweden from −1712.

As Governor-General he commanded Swedish forces in 1675/76 against the allied German armies during the Bremen-Verden Campaign, but eventually had to surrender. He was given the command of the Royal Swedish Navy in 1677 and was made a member of the Privy Council of Sweden (riksråd). That same year, he was defeated by Denmark in the Battle of Køge Bay during the Scanian War. He was appointed to the head of the College of Amiralities in 1677. In 1678, he was appointed as the Commander-in-Chief of Livonia which was a dominion of the Swedish Empire from 1629 until 1721. In 1680, Horn left Livonia and returned to help rebuild Stade which had been besieged in 1676 during the Swedish-Brandenburg War.

== Personal life ==
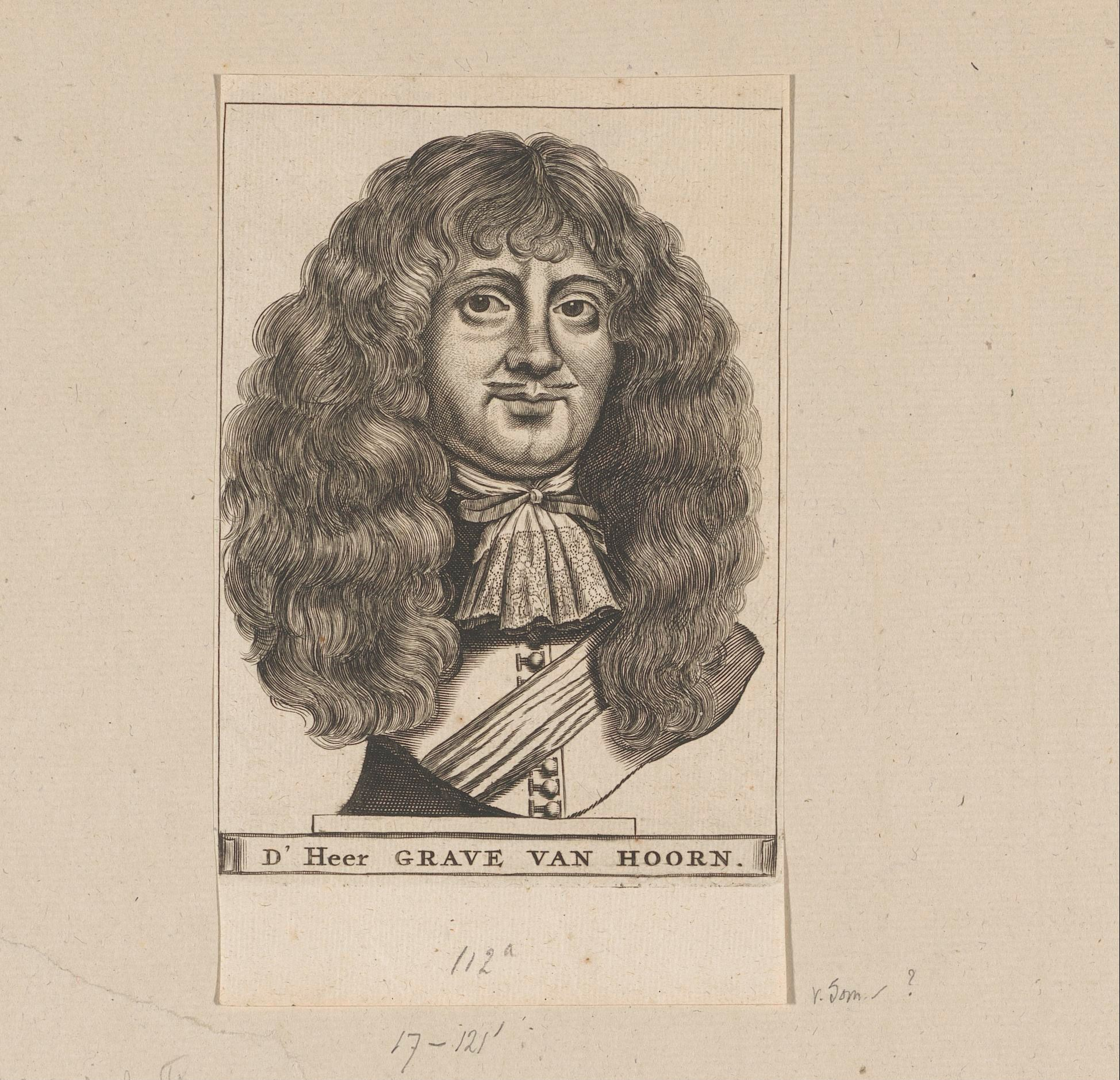
1674 book illustration of Henrik Horn, Lord Count of Horn

Horn married Beata Magdalena Wittenberg in 1674. In 1675 she completed a diplomatic mission assigned by him.

Horn died in Stade, 1693.

== See also ==
- Horn family

== Other Sources ==
- Horn, Henrik in Nationalencyklopedin (1992).
