= Gooi =

Area around Hilversum, the Netherlands

Coordinates: 52°14′N 5°13′E

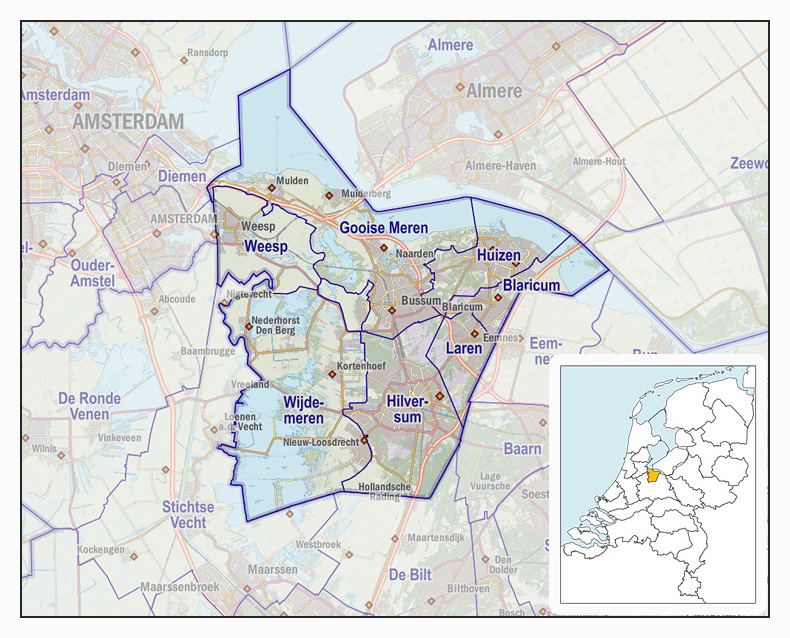
The Gooi en Vechtstreek region as it is currently defined by the Dutch government, 2017

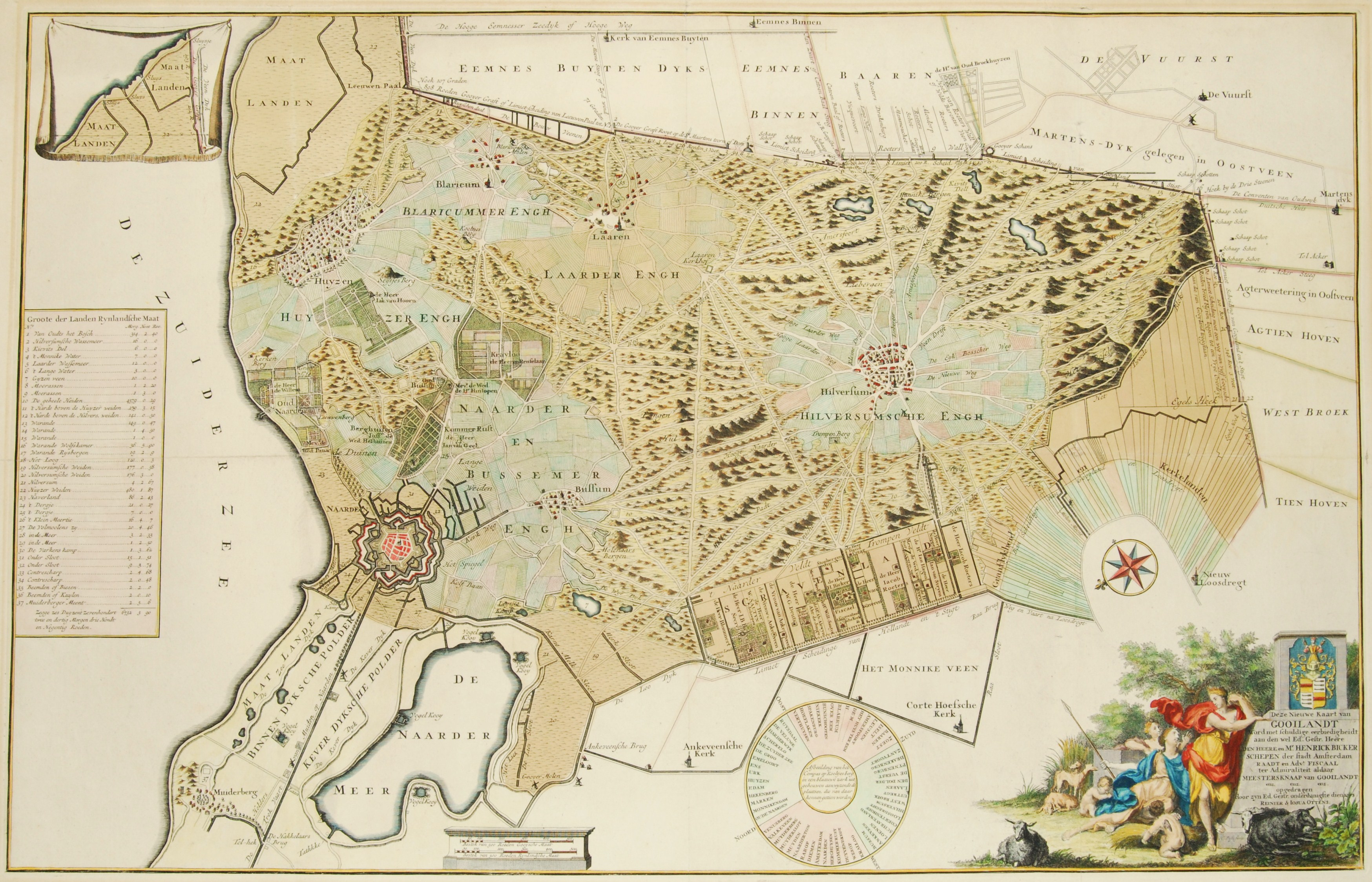
Gooiland map drawn between 1725 and 1734 by Reinier and Joshua Ottens

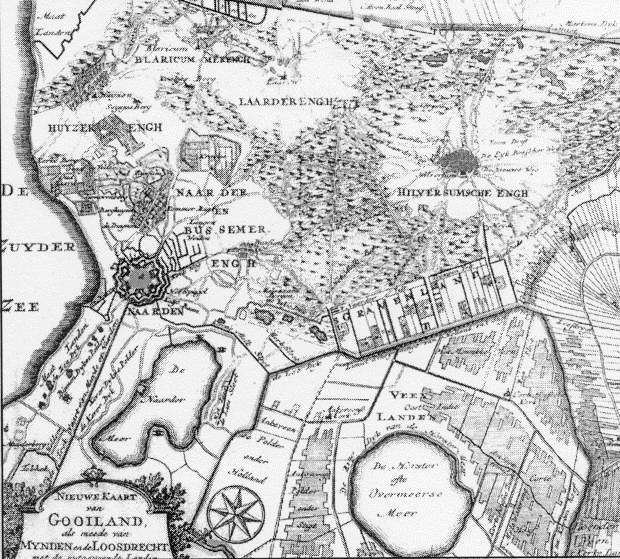
Historic map of the Gooi

The Gooi (Dutch: Het Gooi [ət ˈxoːi]) (Note: Gooi in isolation: [ɣoːi].) is an area around Hilversum, in the centre of the Netherlands. It is a slightly hilly area characterised by its green landscape, its historical charm, the wealth of its inhabitants and its villas. The Gooi is known in the country as the home of the rich and famous.

== Name ==
The name Gooi is related to gouw, the Dutch word for "gau", being an old name for a 'region'. The Gooi is conventionally referred to in Dutch as het Gooi or 't Gooi, literally meaning 'the Gooi'. It is also sometimes referred to as "Gooiland". In English, the area is generally referred to as "Het Gooi" (capital "H") or "the Gooi area".

== Location and composition ==
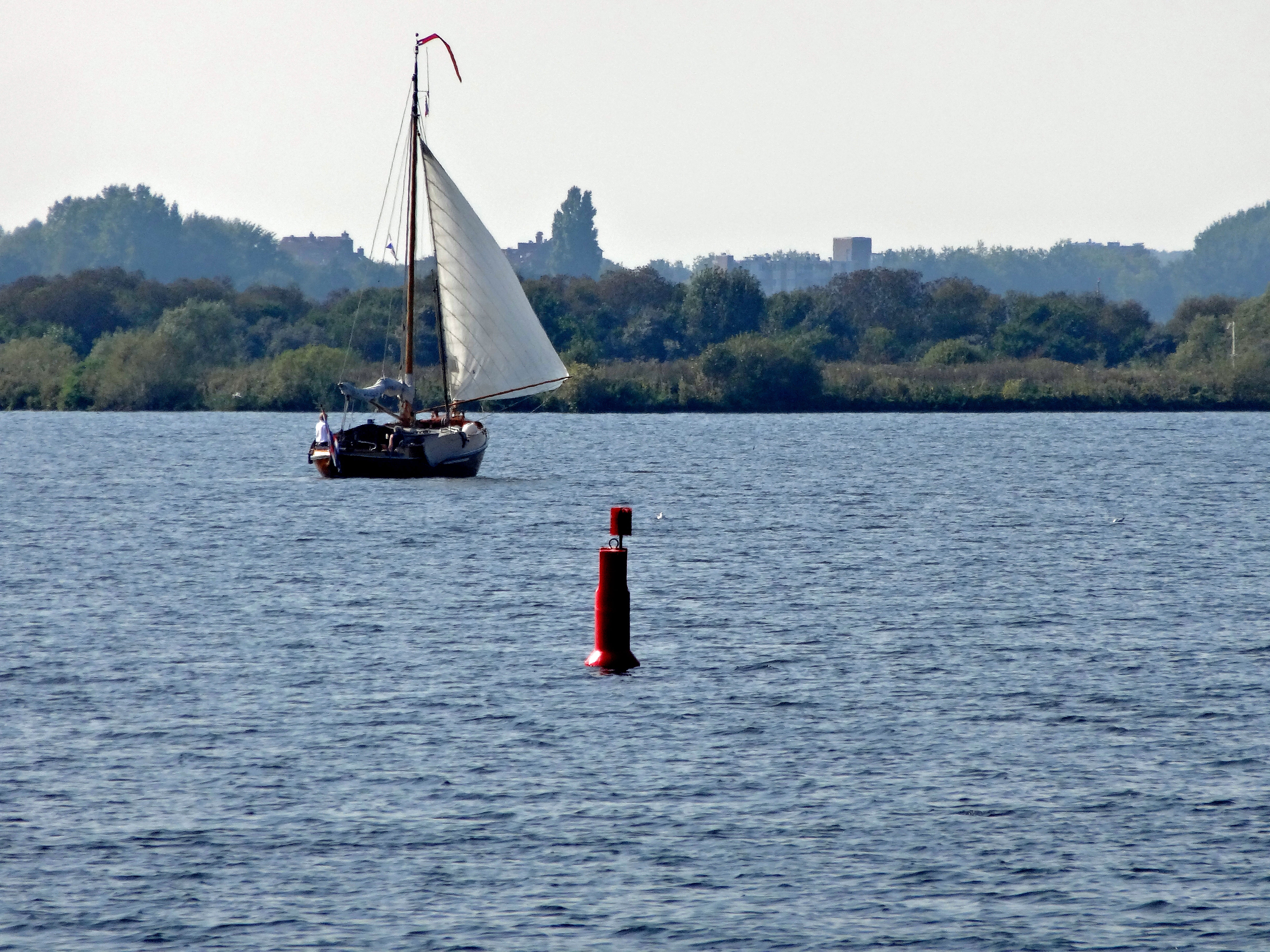
Gooimeer

The Gooi is the area around Hilversum in the southeastern corner of the province of North Holland. It is located east of Amsterdam and north of Utrecht, between Amersfoort and Amsterdam. The boundaries are not clearly demarcated. It is generally the area between a dry ditch called the Gooyergracht, dug in 1356 to demarcate the border with the province of Utrecht, and the river Vecht. The Gooi refers traditionally to the part of this area that lies in the province of North Holland. Often the term is used to refer just to the higher, sandy, forested part of this area. The towns in the area include (in descending order of size): Hilversum (the centre of the area and the largest municipality), Bussum and Naarden, Huizen, Laren and Blaricum.

To the north of the Gooi there is a body of water called Lake Gooi (in Dutch, Gooimeer), a southern extension of the IJsselmeer. An area called the Vechtstreek lies to the west of the Gooi. Eemland in the province of Utrecht lies to the east. The towns of Weesp and Eemnes are also sometimes thought to be in the Gooi. Their inclusion would mean that the region extends in the west to the Amsterdam–Rhine Canal (not just to the Vecht) and in the east to the river Eem (not just to the Gooyergracht). However, historically and geographically these towns are not really part of the Gooi. Weesp is part of the Vechtstreek and Eemnes part of Eemland.

To the west and southwest there are two lake systems called the Loosdrecht Lakes (Loosdrechtseplassen) and the Ankeveen Lakes (Ankeveenscheplassen). On 1 January 2002 the towns in the area of these lake systems was organised into a municipality called Wijdemeren. This municipality includes Ankeveen, Breukeleveen, 's-Graveland, Kortenhoef, Muyeveld, Nederhorst den Berg, Nieuw-Loosdrecht and Oud-Loosdrecht. Some of this area is fenland. Since then this area has also been considered to be part of the Gooi, although historically not all of it was. Pasture land called the Utrechtse weilanden lies to the south. To the southeast lies a wooded area in the province of Utrecht called the Laagte van Pijnenburg, or Pijnenburg Depression, marking the transition to the central part of the Utrecht Hill Ridge.

Two motorways run through the Gooi: the A1 runs east and west; the A27 runs north and south. The railways running from Amsterdam to Hilversum and Amersfoort (Gooilijn, part of the Amsterdam–Zutphen railway) and from Hilversum to Utrecht (Hilversum–Lunetten railway) run through the area. A line called the "Gooiboog" links the Gooilijn with the Weesp–Lelystad railway (Flevolijn) to Almere and Lelystad.

== Landscape and nature ==
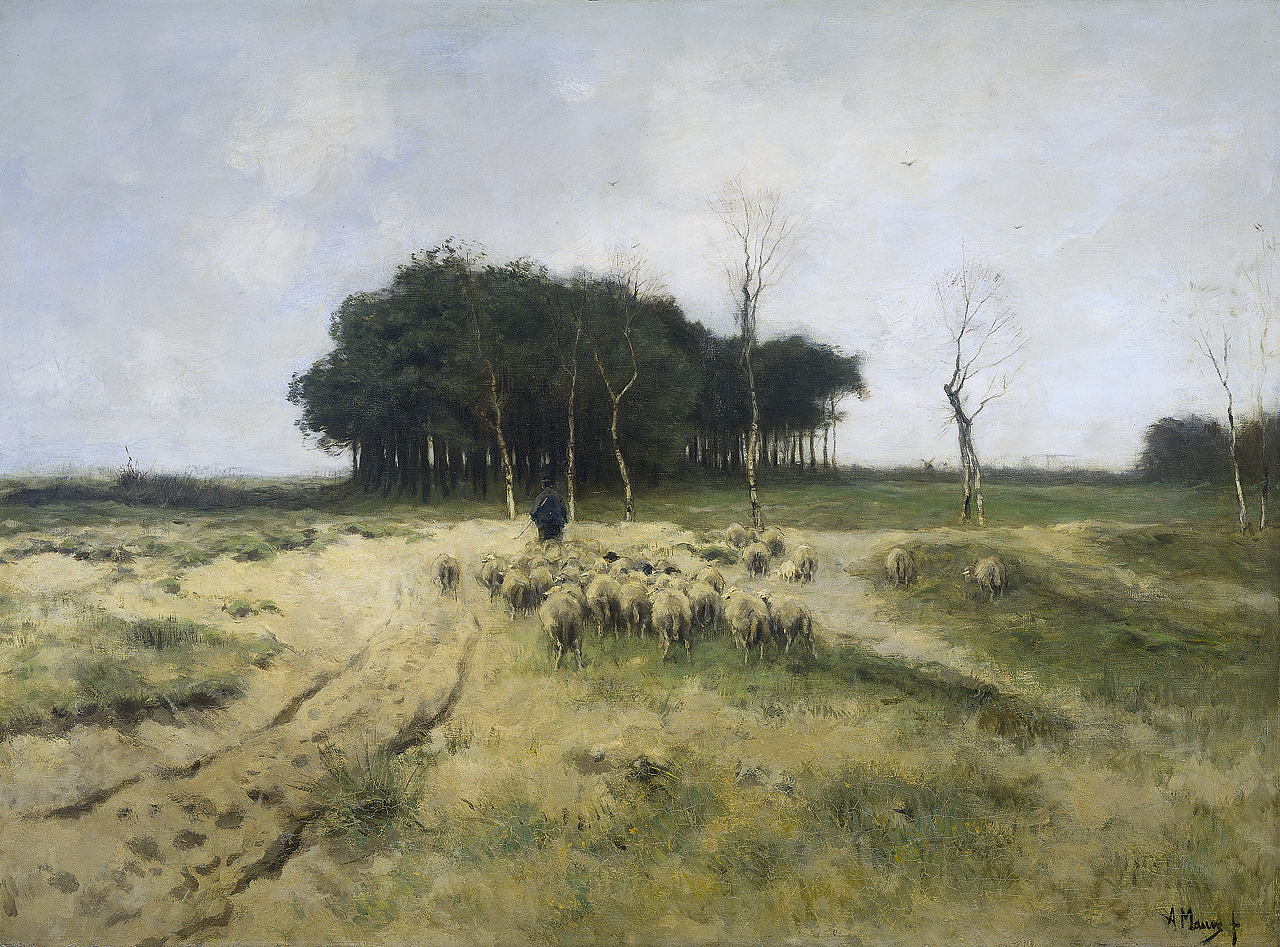
"Heath at Laren", Anton Mauve, 1887

The Gooi is centred on the northernmost point of a geological formation called the Utrecht Hill Ridge (Utrechtse Heuvelrug). The "hilliness" of this area is relative. It is considered hilly because the rest of the countryside is flat and below sea level. The highest point in the Gooi is the Tafelberg (36.4 m above sea level), which is located halfway between Blaricum and Huizen.

Originally the Gooi area was covered with woods and heath. It was at one time encircled by treacherous high and low fen areas (with peat bogs) that created a natural barrier and isolated it from the Utrecht area to the south. Today there is still a good amount of variation in the landscape in the Gooi area. The landscape is dominated by a dry, sandy ridge. To the east and west of the ridge there is flat wet low-lying pasture land. The changes in land elevation, and the transition from wet to dry, are important for many animals and plants. The bodies of water at the margins of the area are fed by water seeping through the sandy ridge.

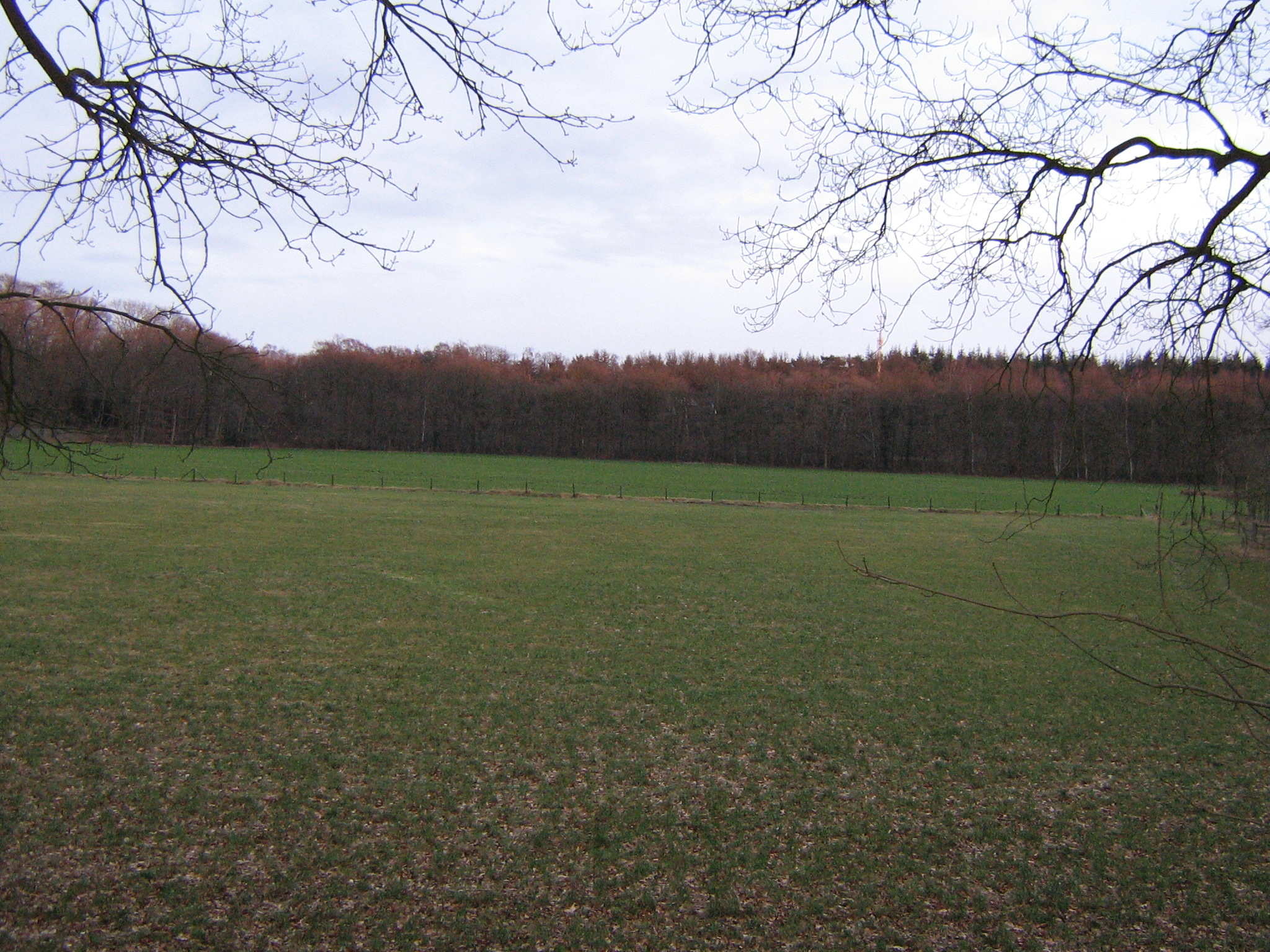
Gooi landscape: Pasture land surrounded by woods

Some of the woods and heath have survived into the present today, notably Spanderswoud, Hilversumse Heide, Hoorneboegse Heide and Bussumer Heide. These areas are now all nature areas managed by the Gooi Nature Reserve Foundation. The vegetation in the area includes deciduous and coniferous woods, heath, grassland with sand pits, land developed as estates and the unique leftovers of open high ground and commons (engen en meenten). Some areas have been set aside for protection, including the Naardermeer (the oldest nature reserve in the Netherlands and the home of a unique colony of black cormorants (phalacrocorax nigra)) and the Gooi Nature Reserve (Goois Natuurreservaat). These areas are valuable buffers against encroaching urban development. A feature of the landscape in the Gooi is the consistent encirclement of many heath areas with wooded margins, creating the illusion of an uninterrupted landscape and keeping the built-up areas out of sight. In the Netherlands this is rare.

There is some concern about the motorways running through the area (the A1 and A27) because they cut through important nature areas. Near Hilversum the longest wildlife crossing overpass in the world has been constructed over the N524 and the Amsterdam-Hilversum railway line. Called the Natuurbrug Zanderij Crailo (literally, the "Crailo Sand Quarry Nature Bridge"), the massive structure is over 800 meters long and spans not just the motorway and railway line, but also a business park, river and sports complex. Monitoring is currently under way to examine the effectiveness of this innovative project combining wildlife protection with urban development.

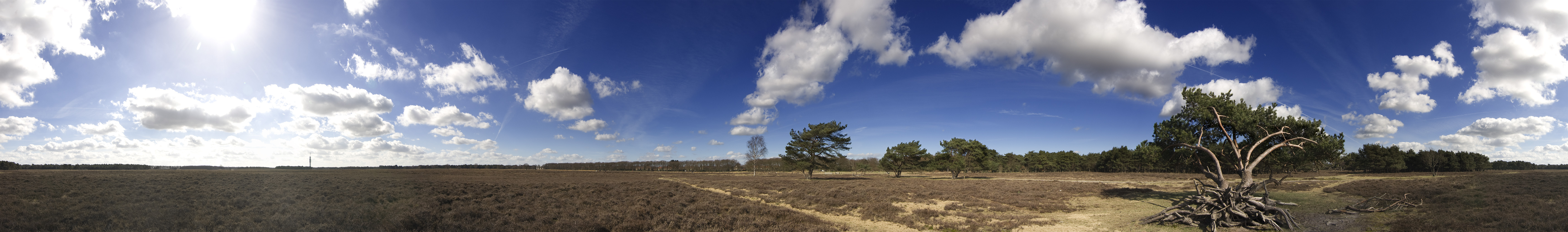
360 degree view of a heath near Bussum

== History ==
=== Prehistory ===
The Gooi area is situated on high sandy ground. In the constantly changing watery landscape of prehistoric Holland, this area was suitable for settlement and is thought to be one of the oldest inhabited parts of the Netherlands. Prehistoric mounds and the remains of the "Hilversum culture" are found in the area. The pottery remains found in Hilversum and area, particularly in burial mounds, indicate that the Hilversum culture dates from the early and mid-Bronze Age period (1800-1200 BCE). This culture is known for its cask-shaped and thick-sided urns, decorated on the edges with finger and nail imprints. The Hofland Geological Museum beside the St. John's Cemetery (St.-Janskerkhof) has a few objects from this culture on display.

In this area water gathered in lower locations on the edges. These drinking spots provided a source of water for livestock and became the centres of the settlements in the area. Because of the low fertility of the sandy soil, the grazing of sheep was the main agricultural activity. This led to the development of wool production.

Until around 1300 the Gooi was mostly undeveloped. There were only a few farming settlements that used the land, woods and open fields in common.

=== Medieval period ===
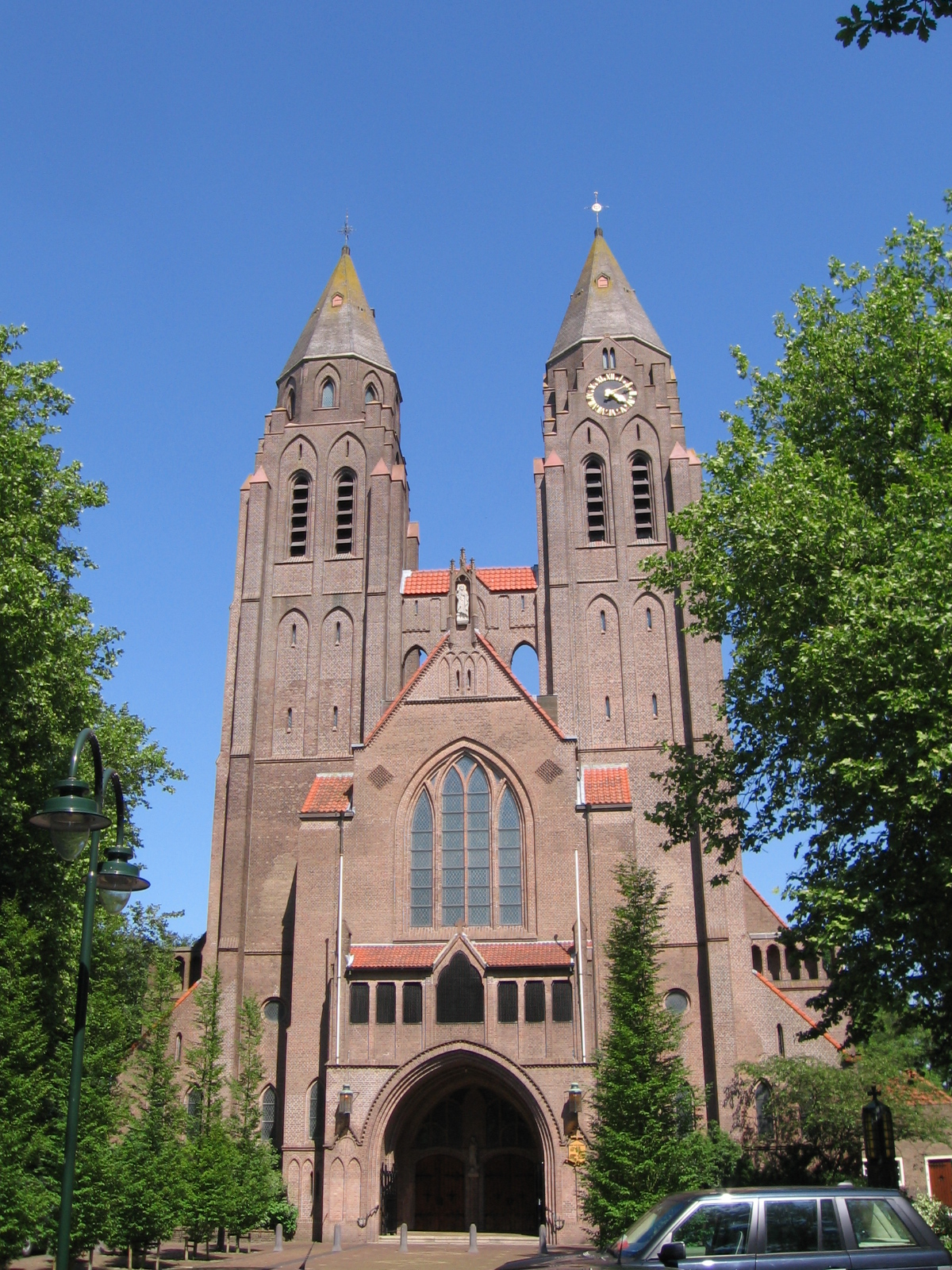
St. John's Basilica in Laren (Sint-Jansbasiliek)

The name of the area was "Nardincklant" (literally, "Naarden Land"). From 968 to 1806, the lordship over Nardincklant was technically held by a noblewomen's convent in Hoog-Elten (nowadays Germany, then part of Guelders) called the "Godgewijde Maagden van Elten" (literally, the "Virgins of Elten Consecrated to God"). It was Count Wichmann of Ghent who founded the convent and gave lordship over the Gooi to the convent.

The first village in the Gooi was Naarden (Oud-Naarden) and was referenced on a list that dates from 887 as "Naruthi". In 1085 a chapel was founded at the current location of the St. John's Cemetery (St.-Janskerkhof) in Laren. It became the religious centre for the area. It developed into a church and a place of pilgrimage, which would later acquire the status of basilica and make Laren the site of an annual St. John's Procession held on the Feast of St. John on 24 June. In 1285 Floris V, Count of Holland, purchased the heerlijkheid rights from the convent. (Afterwards there were disputes between the County of Holland and the Bishopric of Utrecht over the governance of the area.) The churches founded in the other towns in the area all bore the name of St. Vitus, the patron saint of the Gooi. Naarden and Hilversum each had two churches so named; Bussum and Blaricum one each.

Around 1300 a sort of farmer's co-operative (boerenzelforganisatie) was formed in the area. Unique in the Netherlands, its members asserted their rights to use and regulate the land as a commons. Called "the erfgooiers", this medieval organisation remarkably lasted until 1972.

The people in the area (especially Bussum, Laren and Blaricum) spoke a Dutch Low Saxon dialect called "Goois". Emigration from Frisia to Huizen meant that a Frisian dialect was spoken there.

=== Modern era ===
Starting around 1500, and reaching a peak in the 17th century, sand was quarried in the area for the expansion of Amsterdam. As a result a number of waterways were dug in 's-Graveland, Naarden and Bussum. The canal system and the arrival of a canal boat system connecting the area to Amsterdam helped the area to grow further economically. Hilversum developed into a centre for the production of wool and textiles.

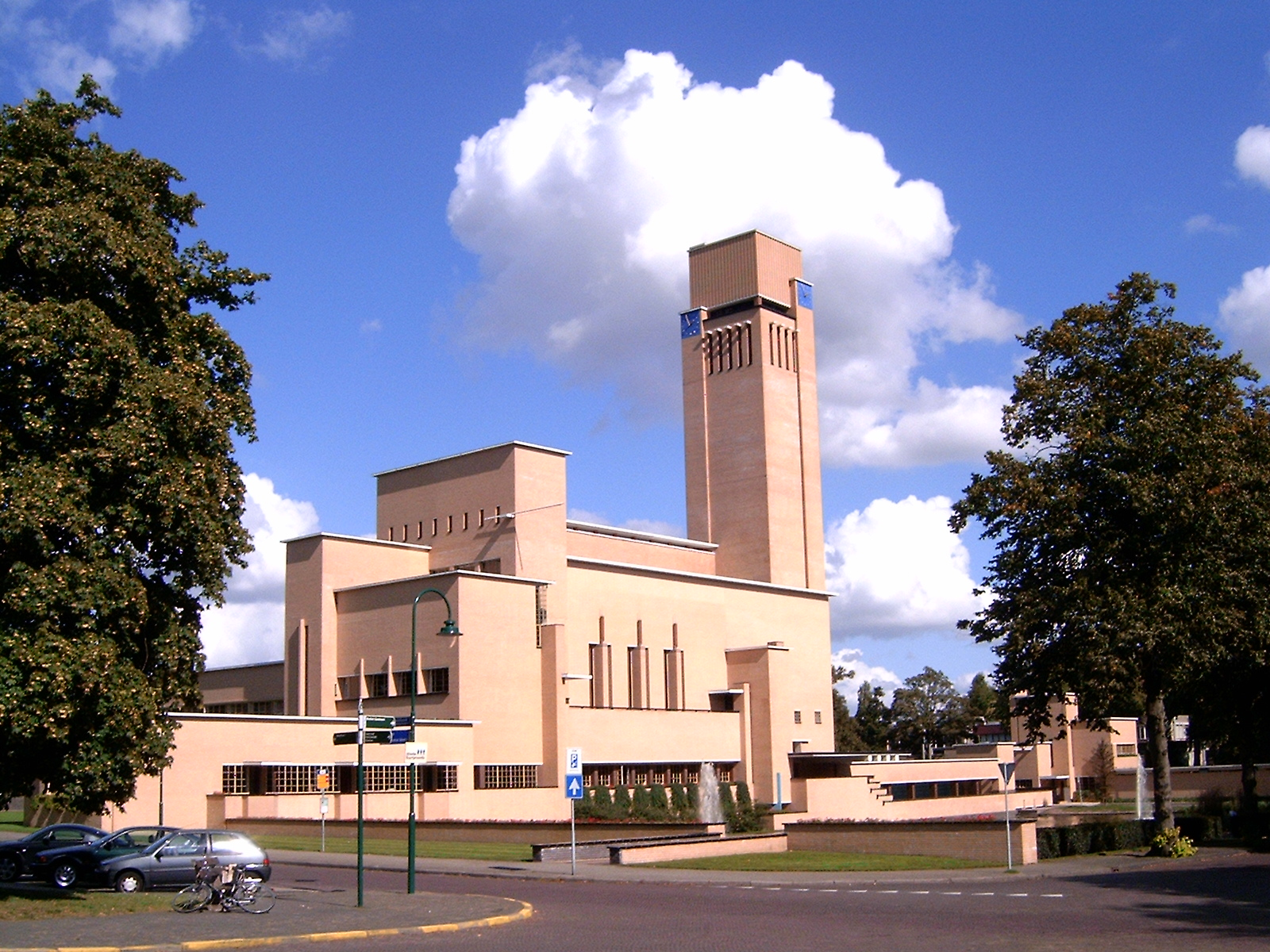
Hilversum town hall, designed by Willem Marinus Dudok in 1924

With the laying of canals, and later the railways, wealthy people from Amsterdam and Utrecht began to build grand country homes in the area. Affluent neighbourhoods (e.g. the Bussum neighbourhood of 't Spiegel) developed. As a result of the railway between Amsterdam and Amersfoort in 1874, Hilversum and Bussum were the first to grow. In 1892, after the tram line connecting Laren, Blaricum and Huizen was laid, these towns also developed. In the 1950s the construction of motorways (the A1 and the A27) continued this process.

The broadcast industry in the Gooi developed after the NSF factory (Nederlandse Seintoestellen Fabriek, Dutch Broadcasting-equipment Factory) was built in Hilversum in 1918. It expanded from Hilversum to the other towns nearby. The first television broadcast in the Netherlands was from Bussum. Today the Netherlands Public Broadcasting has offices and studios all over the area.

The Gooi has become heavily populated. Because of the nature in the area and its historic charm, the villages have become attractive to the affluent, including retirees. The population is relatively older and there are many old-age homes. The original inhabitants of the area have been submerged by the flood of newcomers. The local dialect that used to be spoken here has virtually disappeared.

== Towns in the Gooi ==
=== Hilversum ===
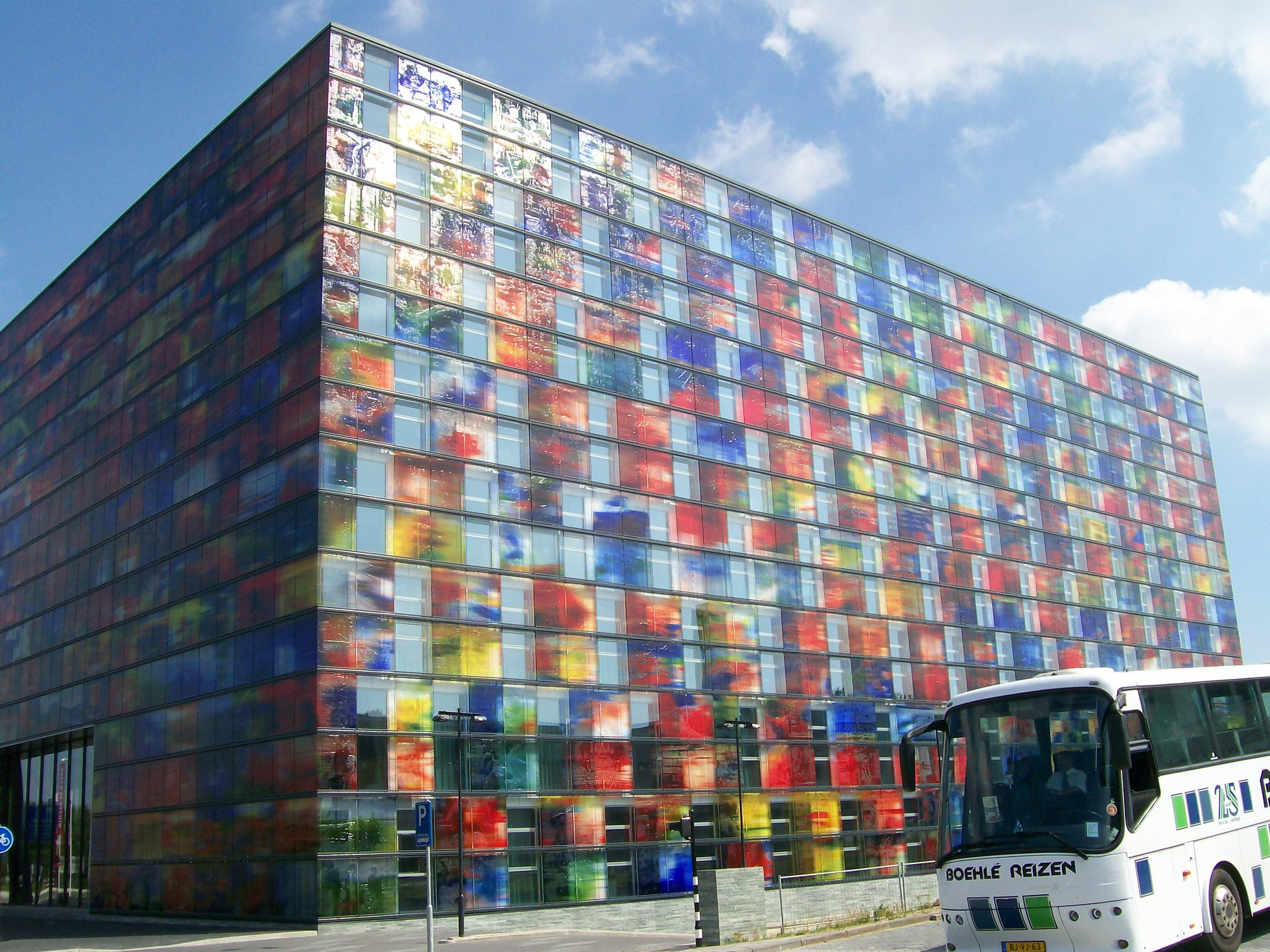
Institute for Sound and Vision, Hilversum

Hilversum is now the most important and the largest town in the Gooi, a role it took over from Naarden in the 18th century. The town is the principal centre for radio and television broadcasting in the Netherlands. A traditionally Catholic town, the most important church is the St. Vitus Church (Sint-Vituskerk).

Hilversum became the centre of the Gooi as a result of the rapid development of wool production and the textile and carpet-making industry. A Philips radio and transmitter factory, called "NSF" or Nederlandse Seintoestellen Fabriek, was built in Hilversum in 1918. This led to the founding of the Netherlands Public Broadcasting system and the various networks, including AVRO, VARA, KRO, NCRV, NTS and the NOS and others. Broadcasting became the major economic activity in the town. In 1965 the town's population was 103,000, but in recent decades it had lost some of its industries and the population has declined. In 2016 the population was 88,000. The city is encircled by nature reserves and unable to expand.

=== Naarden ===
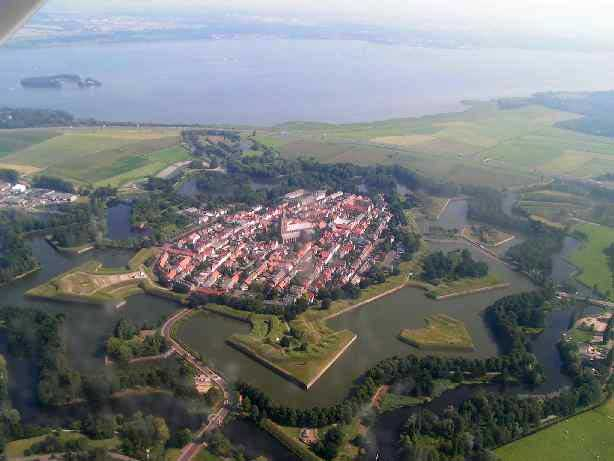
Naarden Fortress

Naarden was granted its city rights in 1300 (the only town in the Gooi to have been done so) and later developed into a fortressed garrison town with a textile industry. Unusually, the walls of the town are still intact and have been restored. Naarden is the home of the Netherlands Fortress Museum (Nederlands Vestingmuseum). Every year Naarden hosts the national photograph festival and, on Good Friday, a performance of Bach's St. Matthew Passion in the local church, which is called the Great Church or St. Vitus Church. Despite its earlier importance, Naarden was surpassed by Hilversum in the 18th century and today is much smaller than its neighbour Bussum. It is now a part of the municipality of Gooise Meren, albeit one with an interesting history and townscape.

=== Laren and Blaricum ===
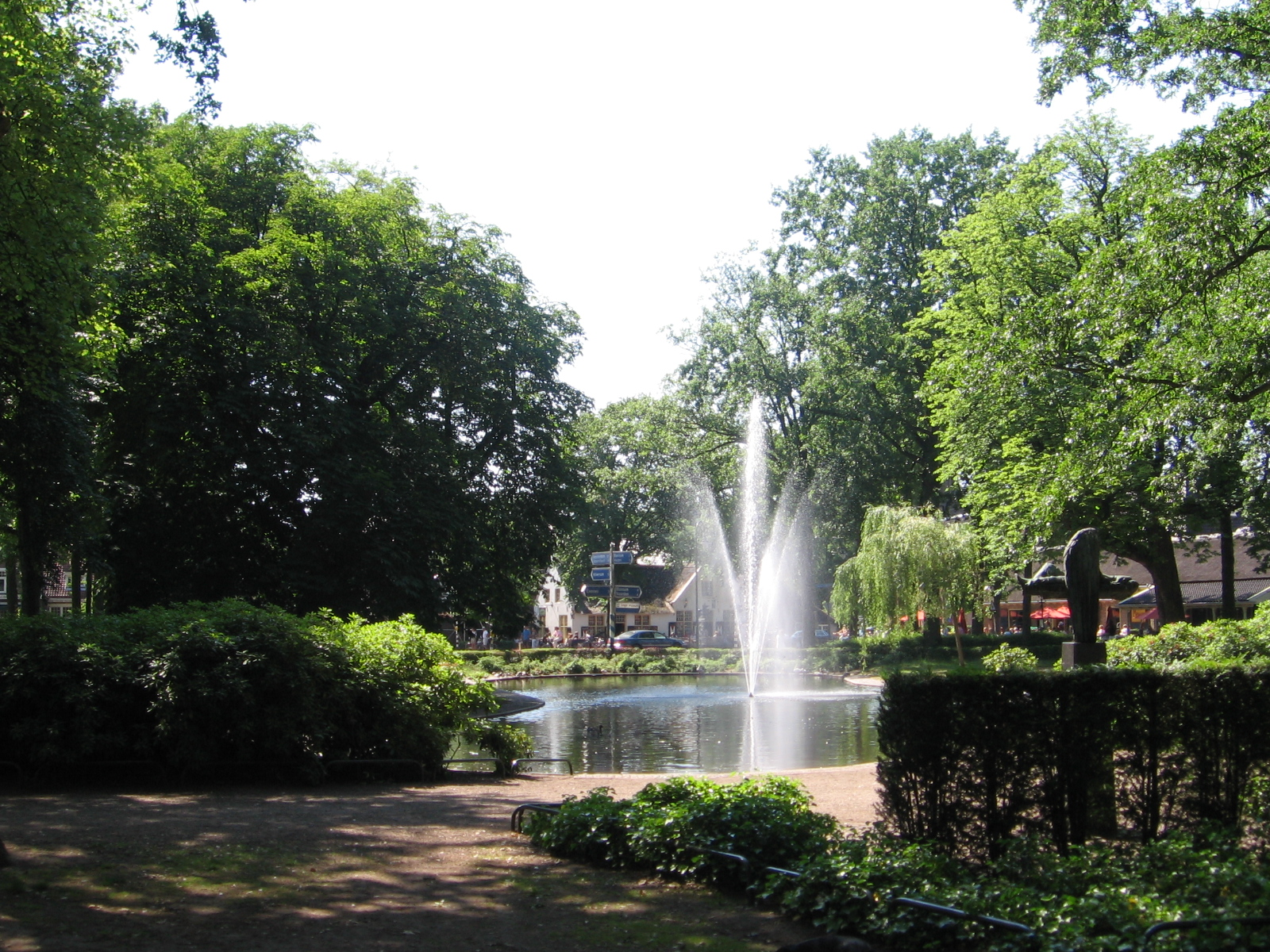
Town square in Laren

Until the 19th century Laren and Blaricum were poor, small farming villages. Laren is former place of pilgrimage and a procession takes place there on 24 June. There are also "death paths" (doodwegen) leading to the cemetery of St. John's Church (Sint-Janskerkhof) in Laren. From around the time of the introduction of the steam train in 1882 until around 1950, there was an artists' colony in the area. The inhabitants included Anton Mauve (teacher of Vincent van Gogh), Jan Sluijters, Ferdinand Hart Nibbrig, Saar de Swart and American art collector William Singer, whose collection became the basis for the Singer Laren museum. Today Laren and Blaricum are residential towns for television personalities, retirees and people who struck it rich during the internet boom in the 1990s. According to Statistics Netherlands (CBS), the residents of Blaricum are the richest of any municipality in the Netherlands. The residents of Laren are the oldest. An interesting feature of Blaricum and Laren is that each still has a recognisable village green in their centre, called a "brink" in Dutch. In Laren it has a pond and fountain in its centre. Quite a few famous people live in Blaricum.

=== Bussum ===
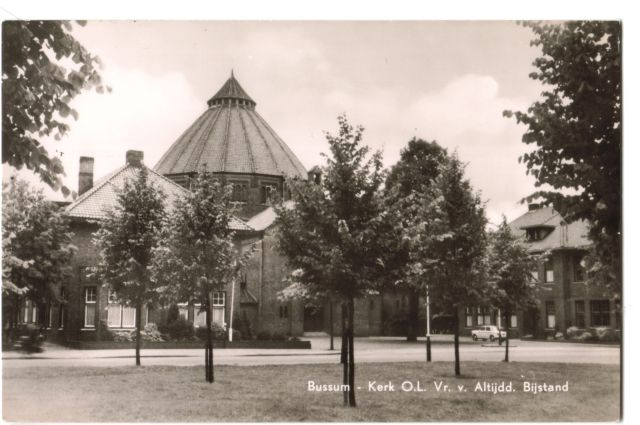
Old photo of the Dome Church (Koepelkerk) in Bussum

Bussum was founded in about 1000 AD. It remained a farming village until the 19th century. When the railway was laid, a station was built for both Bussum and Naarden, making the area more accessible. Artists settled in the town, including Frederik van Eeden, who started his own "Walden colony" here, and Herman Gorter. In the 20th century it grew rapidly as a residential commuter town. In the 1950s the first public television broadcast was made from Studio Irene (now gone). In the 1980s growth slowed and it became somewhat of a retirement community. Its inhabitants are now amongst the oldest of any municipality in the Netherlands. Today, thanks to its location on the Hilversum-Amsterdam railway line, the conurbation of Bussum-Naarden-Hilversumse Meent is the second largest built-up area in Het Gooi, behind Hilversum, but ahead of Huizen.

=== Huizen ===
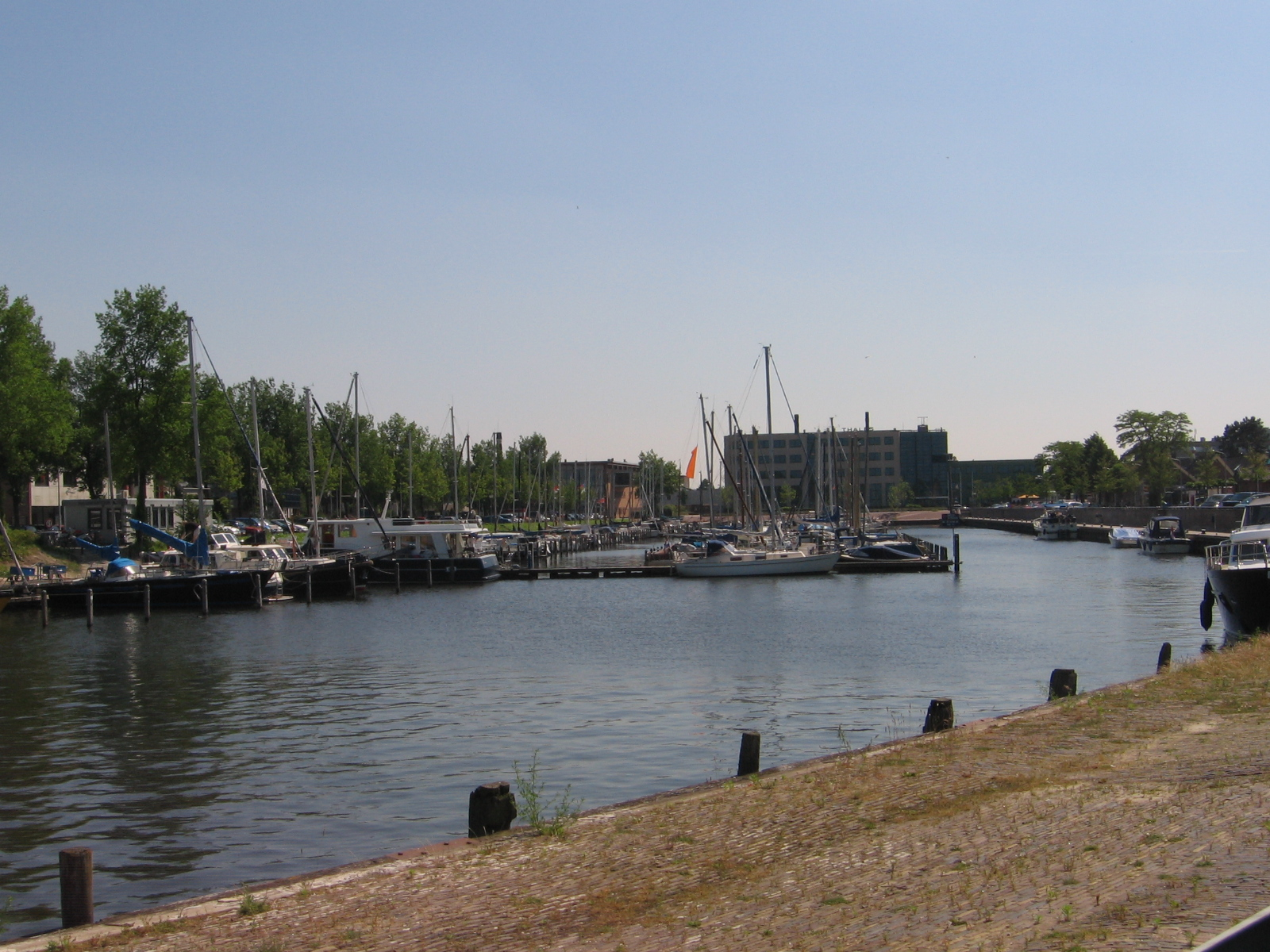
Huizen harbour on the Gooimeer

For centuries Huizen was a traditionally Protestant farming village oriented around the production of cheese, but by the 19th century it had extended to the shore to the north and had become a fishing village as well. After the Zuiderzee was blocked off by the Afsluitdijk and Flevoland was drained and created, the fishing industry died out, but the town is still located on the Gooimeer, a southern extension of the IJsselmeer. After the war, the town grew rapidly because of the construction of a Philips factory there (since closed). Unlike Bussum and Hilversum, the population of the town is still growing and has a residential character. With its population of 42,000, Huizen is one of the larger towns in the Netherlands without its own railway connection.

== Cultural and historical items of interest ==
There are a number of cultural and historical items of interest in the area:

- Prehistoric burial mounds
- The "death paths" (doodwegen) leading to the cemetery of St. John's Church (Sint-Janskerkhof) in Laren
- The Erfgooiers
- The village centres of Laren and Blaricum, the only villages in the province of North Holland with recognisable village greens
- The fort and museum at Naarden
- The old fishing harbour and village centre of Huizen
- The remaining structures in the historical defence line of Amsterdam (Stelling van Amsterdam)
- The architecture and broadcasting studios at Hilversum
- The estate landscape of 's-Graveland
- The remaining structures in the northern part of the historical Dutch Water Line
- The original Gooi dialect (now almost extinct)

== Public image ==
For Dutch people, the Gooi area is synonymous with the broadcasting industry, the affluence of the area's inhabitants and high property values. "Gooi parking" is the casual parking of a high-priced automobile outside permitted places. The phrase "the Gooi mattress" is a reference to the perceived loose morals of the broadcasting industry. The English equivalent is probably the "casting couch". The reputation of Het Gooi has (perhaps forever) been marked by the popular television show "Gooi Women" (Gooische Vrouwen), which follows the lives of four decadent women living in the area.

People from the Gooi are known for how they pronounce "r" at the end of syllables. The "r" in a word like "vier" is not rolled as it is in Standard Dutch. It is pronounced almost like the American "r" and so that "daardoor" sounds like "daawrwdoowrw". That is not the original local dialect but a modern speech pattern of people who have moved to the Gooi from Amsterdam and elsewhere in the Randstad. Because so many people from the area of the Gooi appear on television, this manner of speech is influential throughout the country.
