= Loosdrecht =

Coordinates: 52°13′N 5°04′E

- Town
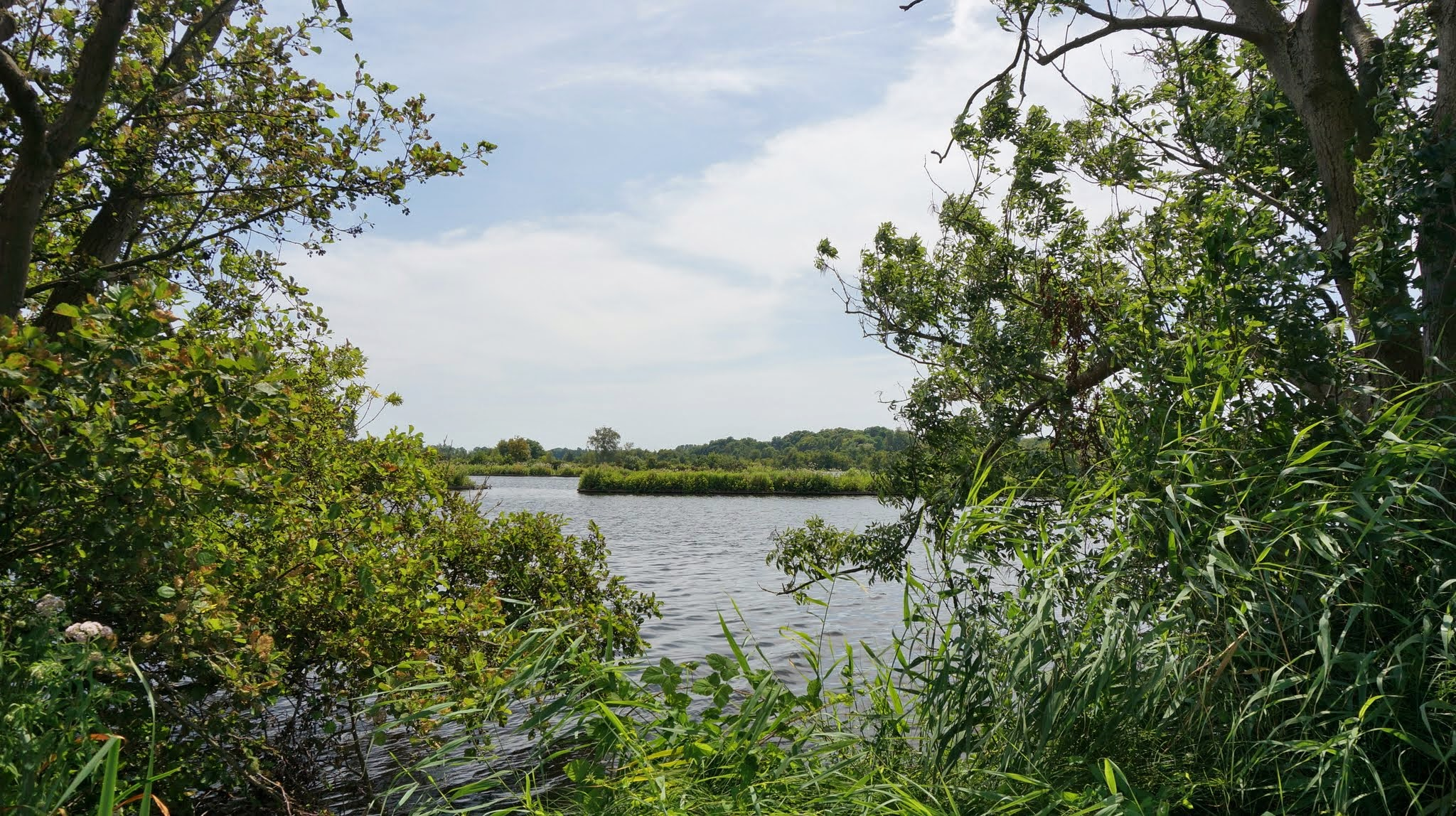
- Loosdrechtse Plassen, west of the village

- Flag Coat of arms

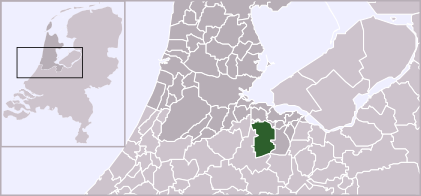
- Country: Netherlands
- Province: North Holland
- Municipality: Wijdemeren

Loosdrecht (Dutch pronunciation: [ˈloːzdrɛxt]) is a town in the municipality of Wijdemeren, North Holland, the Netherlands, with a population of about 8,600 inhabitants.

Loosdrecht consists of two small villages: Nieuw-Loosdrecht and Oud-Loosdrecht. Nieuw Loosdrecht covers a small area densely populated; Oud-Loosdrecht consists mainly of lakeside villas. Until 2002 Loosdrecht was a separate municipality in the province of Utrecht, covering the villages of Oud-Loosdrecht and Nieuw-Loosdrecht, and the hamlets of Breukeleveen and Muyeveld.

Loosdrecht is known for its lakes, the Loosdrechtse Plassen, which thousands of tourists visit every year. The lakes are a hotspot for the well-to-do, with several exclusive yachting clubs and restaurants lining the shores. Smaller boats can visit the Vuntus and other quieter lakes on the northern side of Loosdrecht, connected to the main lakes through a small underpass.

== See also ==
- Porcelain manufacturing companies in Europe
- Joannes de Mol
