= Wijdemeren =

- Municipality
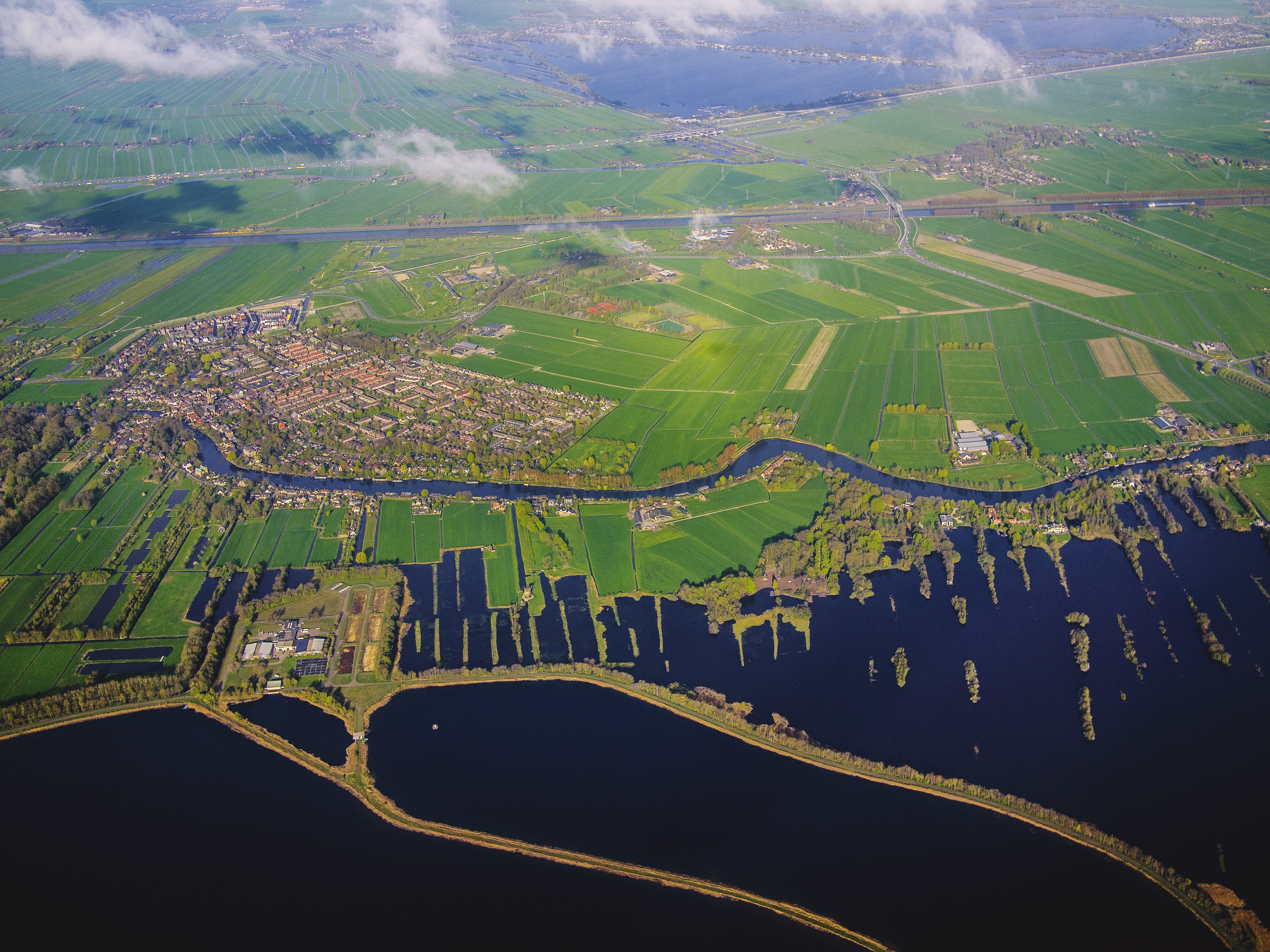
- Loosdrechtse Plassen

- Flag Coat of arms

- Location in North Holland
- Coordinates: 52°12′N 5°9′E
- Country: Netherlands
- Province: North Holland
- Established: 1 January 2002

Government
  - Body: Municipal council
  - Mayor: M.L. Verheijen (VVD)

Area
  - Total: 76.36 km^{2} (29.48 sq mi)
  - Land: 47.60 km^{2} (18.38 sq mi)
  - Water: 28.76 km^{2} (11.10 sq mi)
- Elevation: 1 m (3.3 ft)

Population (January 2021)
  - Total: 24,463
  - Density: 514/km^{2} (1,330/sq mi)
- Time zone: UTC+1 (CET)
  - Summer (DST): UTC+2 (CEST)
- Postcode: 1230–1244, 1394, 3625
- Area code: 0294, 035
- Website: wijdemeren.nl

Wijdemeren (Dutch pronunciation: [ˌʋɛidəˈmeːrə(n)]) is a municipality in the Netherlands, in the province of North Holland, on the western border of the Gooi region.

Wijdemeren contains many lakes, including Spiegelplas and Ankeveense Plassen in the north(east) and Loosdrechtse Plassen in the (south)west.

Wijdemeren was established as a merger of 's-Graveland, Loosdrecht, and Nederhorst den Berg on 1 January 2002. The former municipality of Loosdrecht belonged to the province of Utrecht.

On 1 January 2027 Wijdemeren will be merged into the municipality of Hilversum.

== Population centres ==
The municipality of Wijdemeren includes the following small towns and villages:

- Ankeveen
- Boomhoek
- Breukeleveen
- 's-Graveland
- Kortenhoef
- Muyeveld
- Nederhorst den Berg
- Nieuw-Loosdrecht
- Oud-Loosdrecht.

=== Topography ===
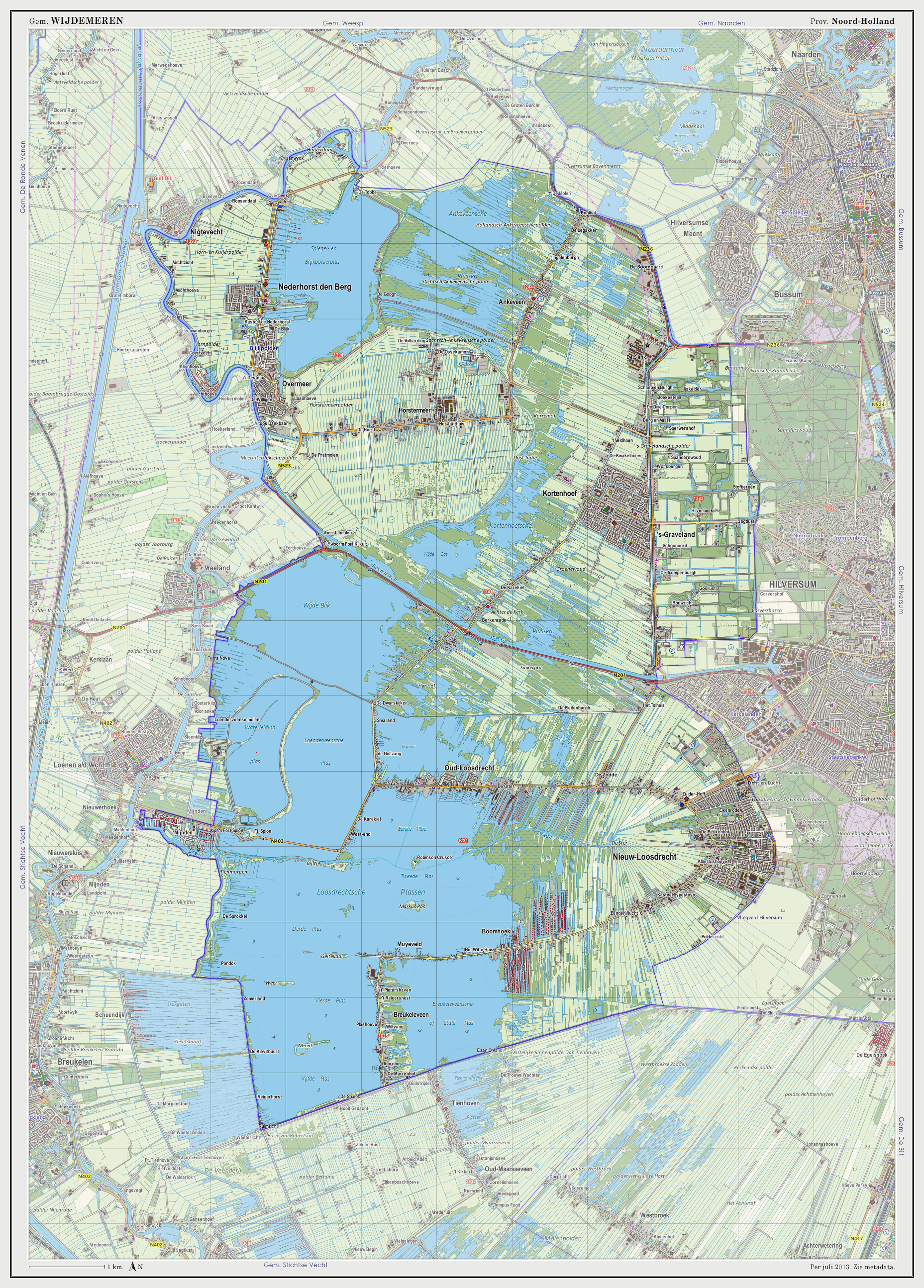
Map of the municipality of Wijdemeren, 2013.

== Local government ==
Parties	Seats 2014-18	Seats 2018-22	Seats 2022-26
De Lokale Partij	-	4	8
CDA	7	4	3
Dorpsbelangen	4	4	2
VVD	3	3	2
D66	3	2	1
PvdA-GL	2	2	2
CU	-	-	1
Total	19	19	19

== Notable people ==
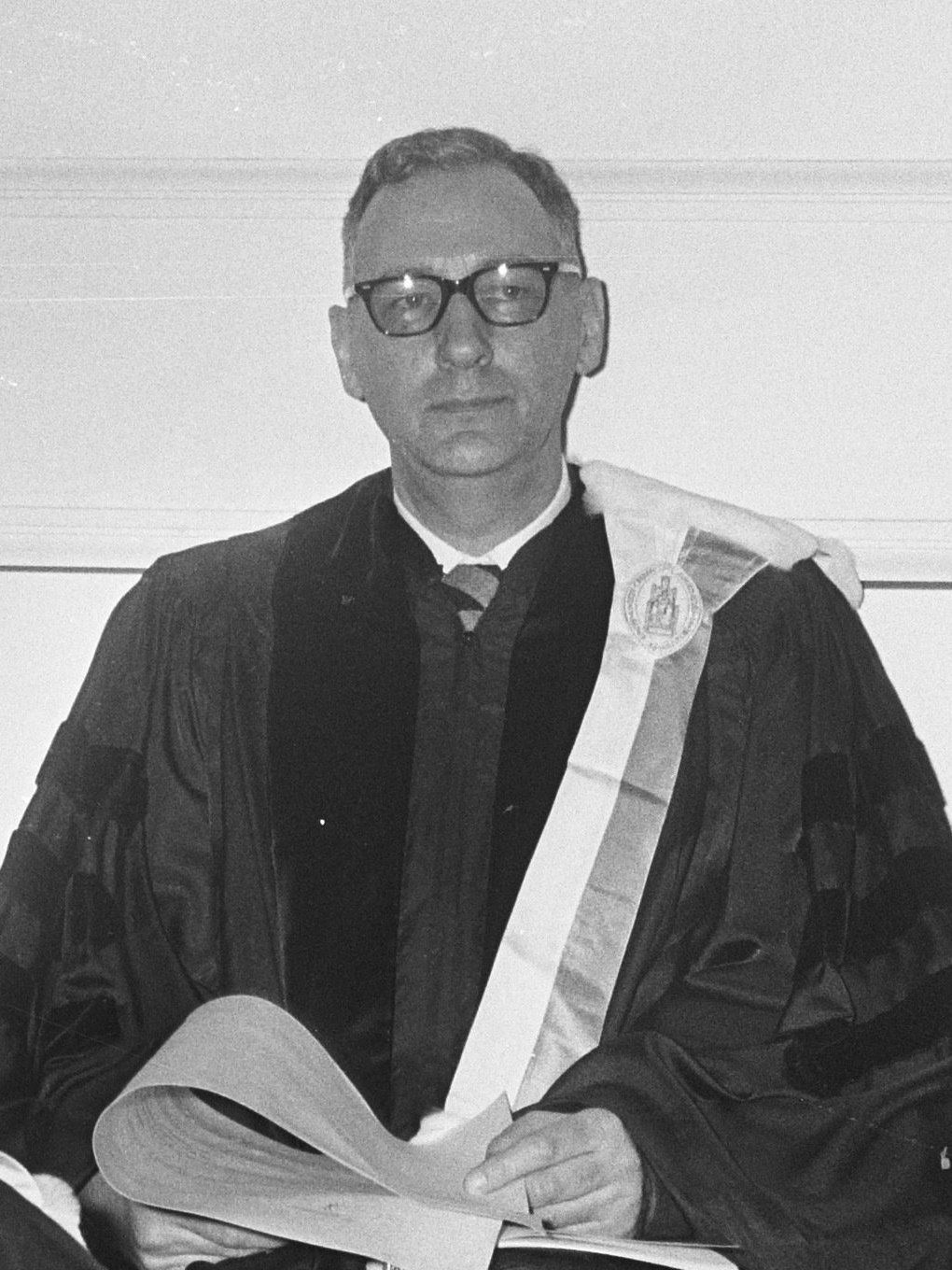
Tjalling Koopmans, 1967

- Jan Jacob Spöhler (1811–1866) painter
- Hendrik Jan Schimmel (1823–1906) poet and novelist
- Barend Klaas Kuiper (1877–1961) history professor and author, wrote on Dutch Calvinist church history
- Tjalling Koopmans (1910–1985) Dutch American mathematician and economist, joint winner of the 1975 Nobel Memorial Prize in Economic Sciences
- Gustav Leonhardt (1928–2012) keyboard player, conductor, musicologist, teacher and editor
- Feike Sijbesma (born 1959) CEO of DSM
- Jeanine Hennis-Plasschaert (born 1973) politician and diplomat

=== Sport ===
- Nelleke Penninx (born 1971) retired rower, competed at the 1996 Summer Olympics and silver medallist at the 2000 Summer Olympics
- Jip Vastenburg (born 1994) long-distance athlete, competeted in the 2016 Summer Olympics

== Gallery ==
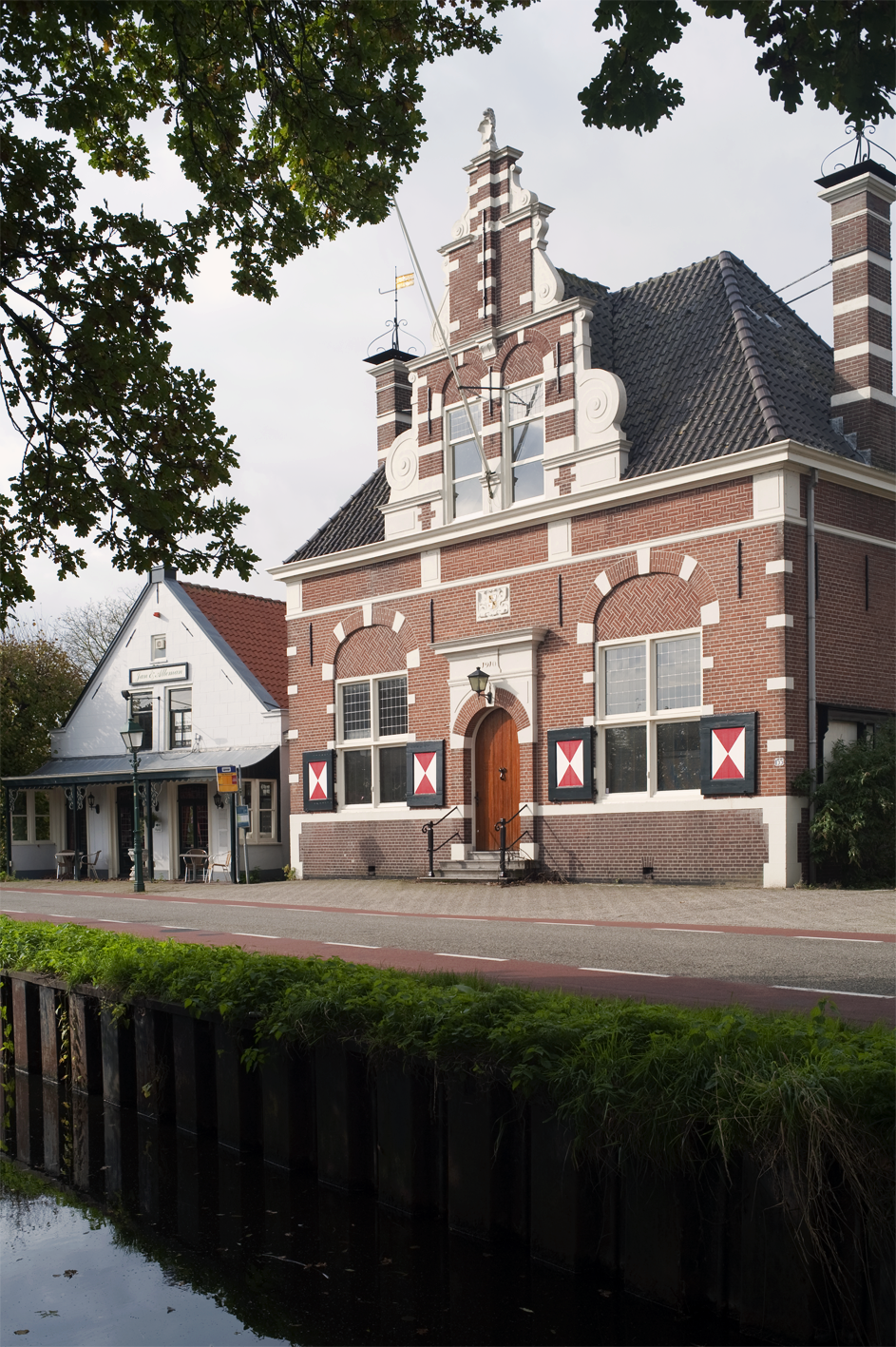
Kortenhoefs dijk,

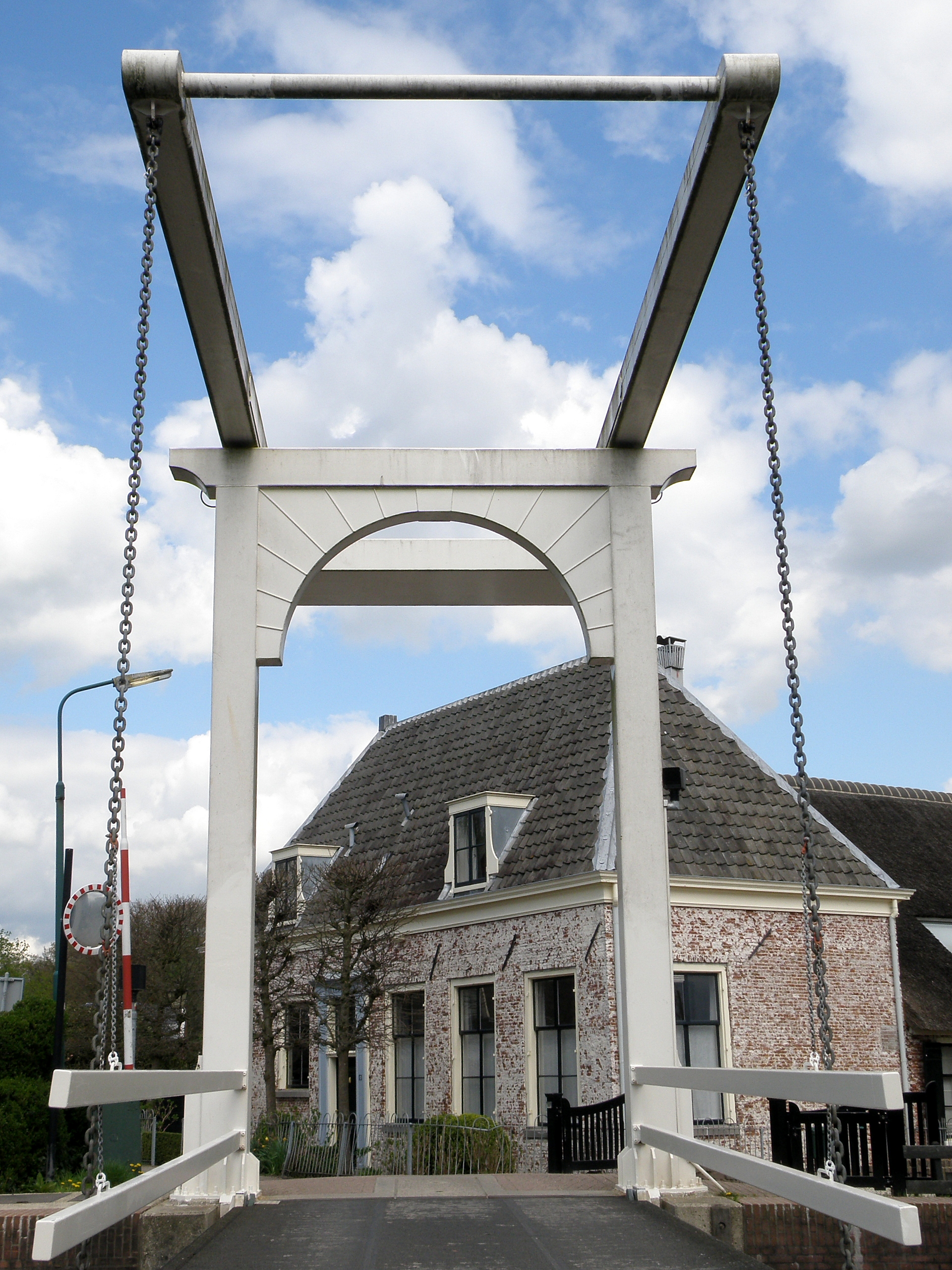
Loenen Mijndense Sluis

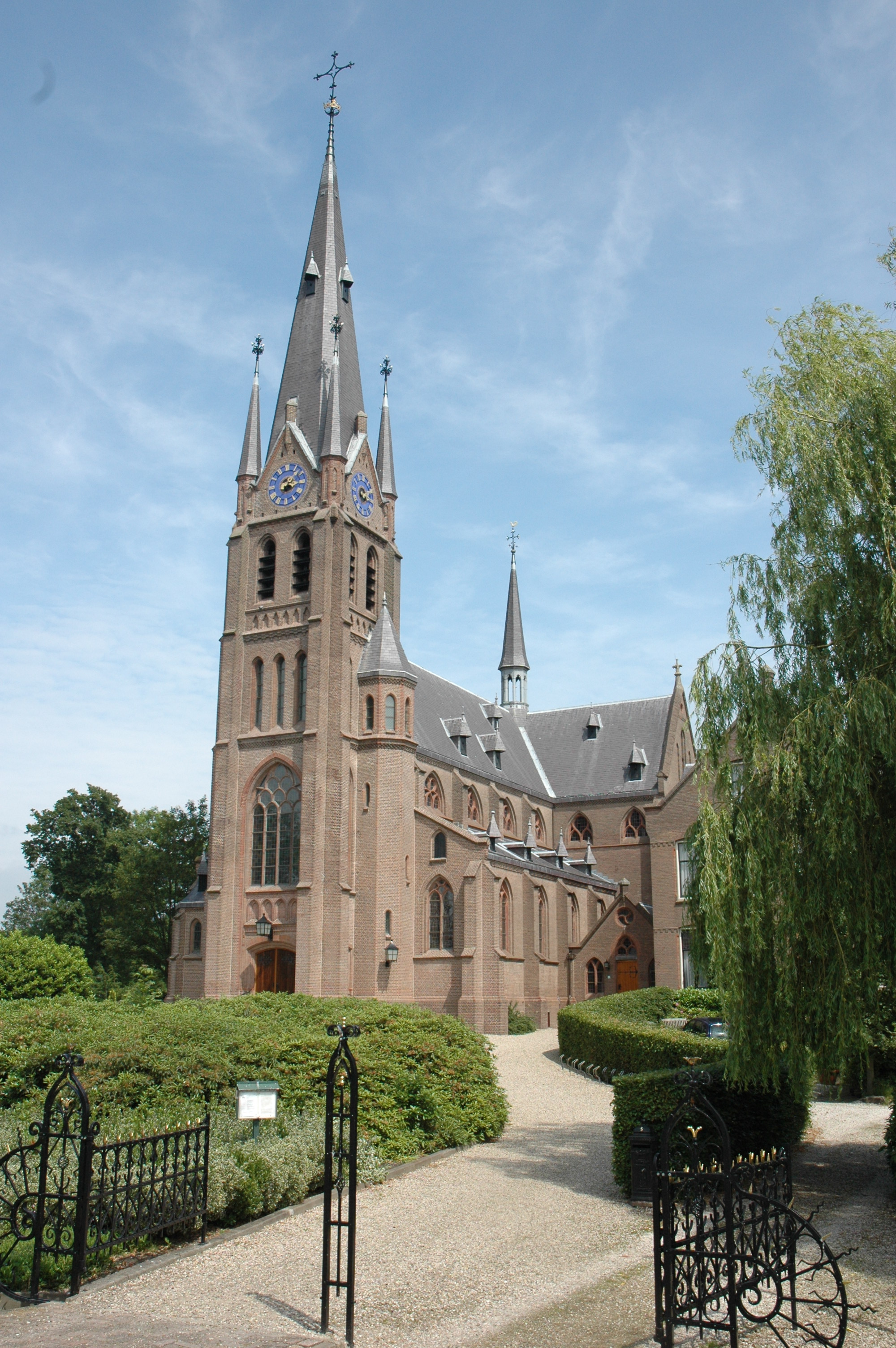
Nederhorst Den Berg RK kerk

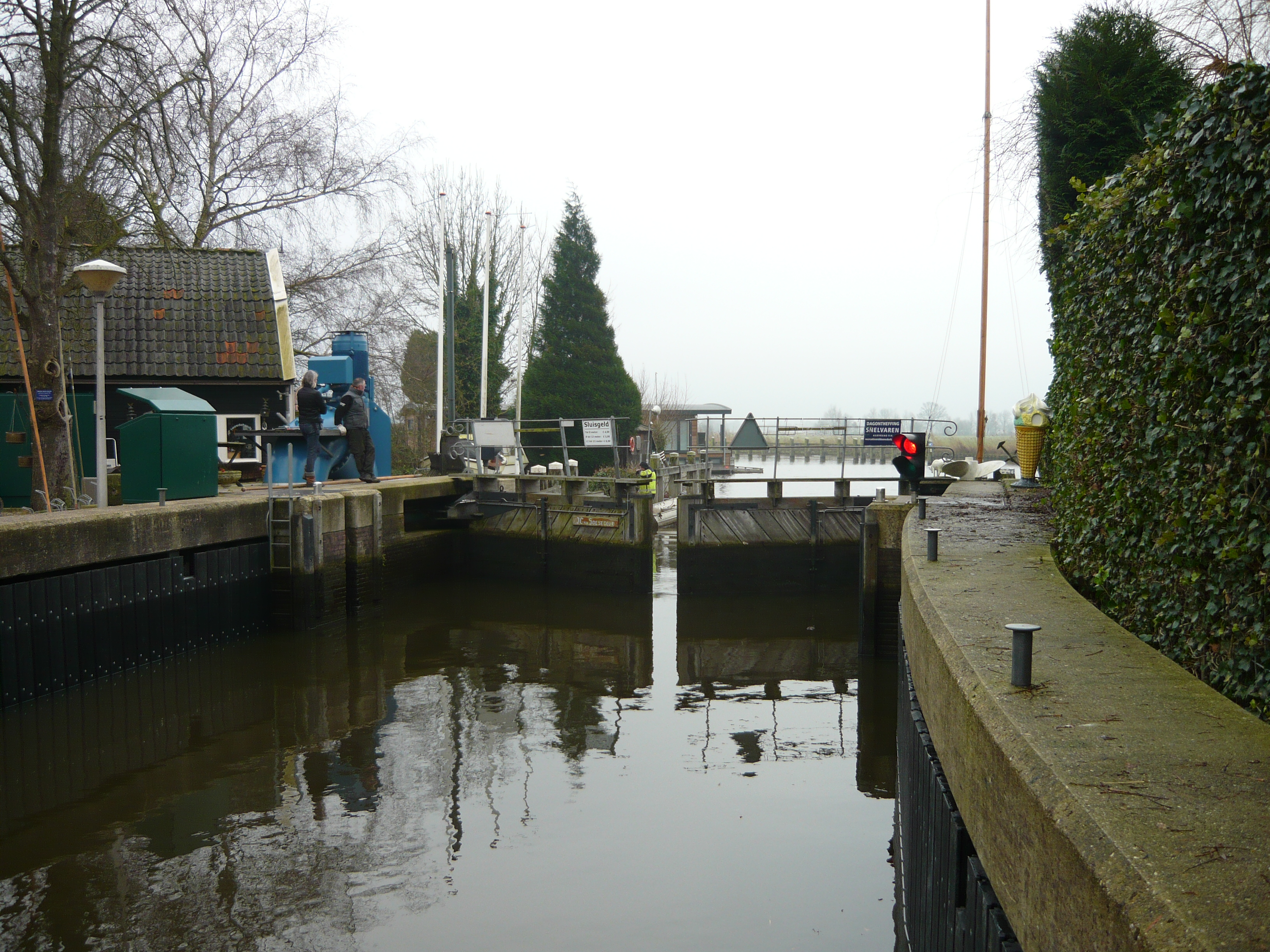
Mijndense sluis

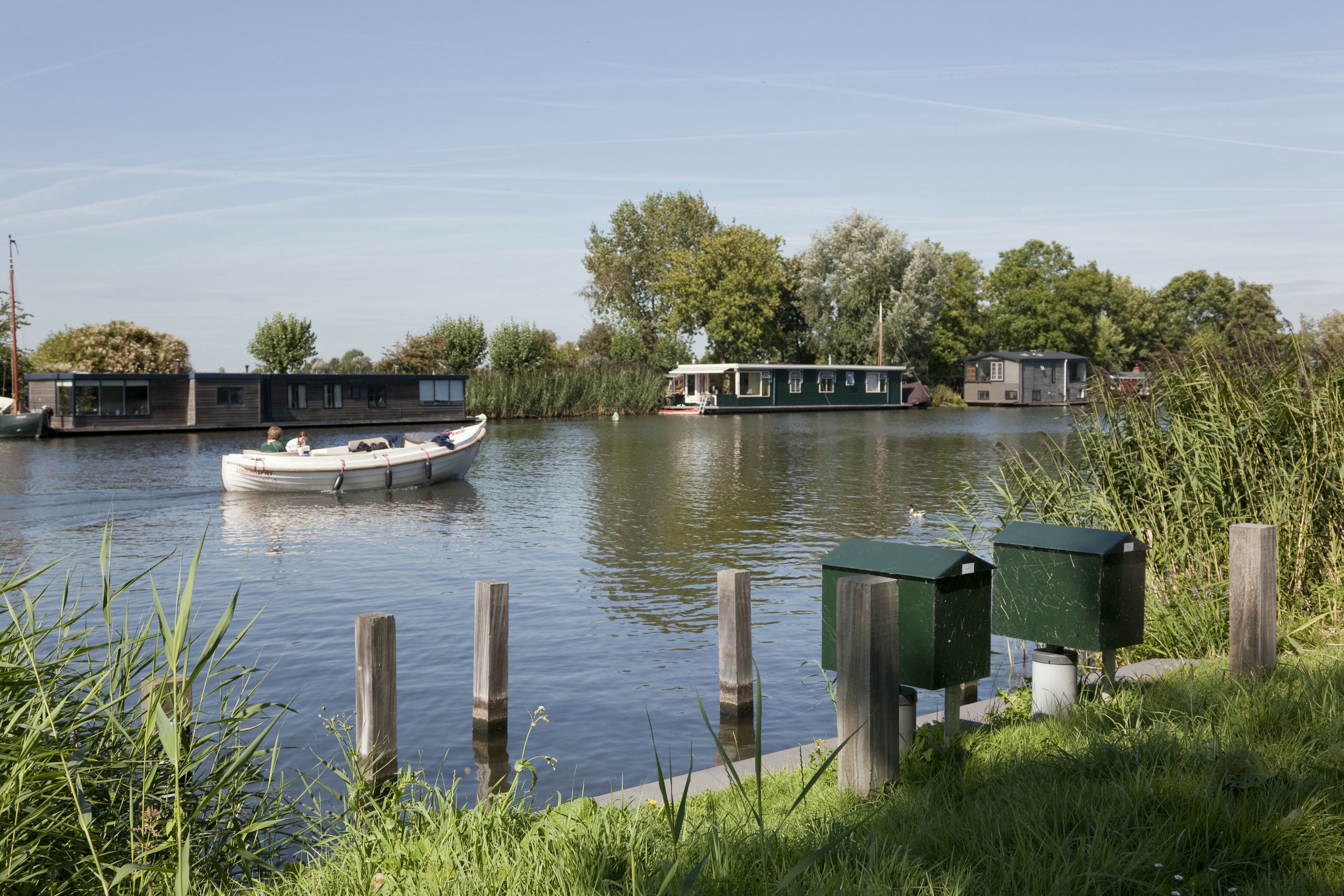
Betonnen werken Hinderdam - Kijkuit
