= Feike Sijbesma =

Dutch businessman

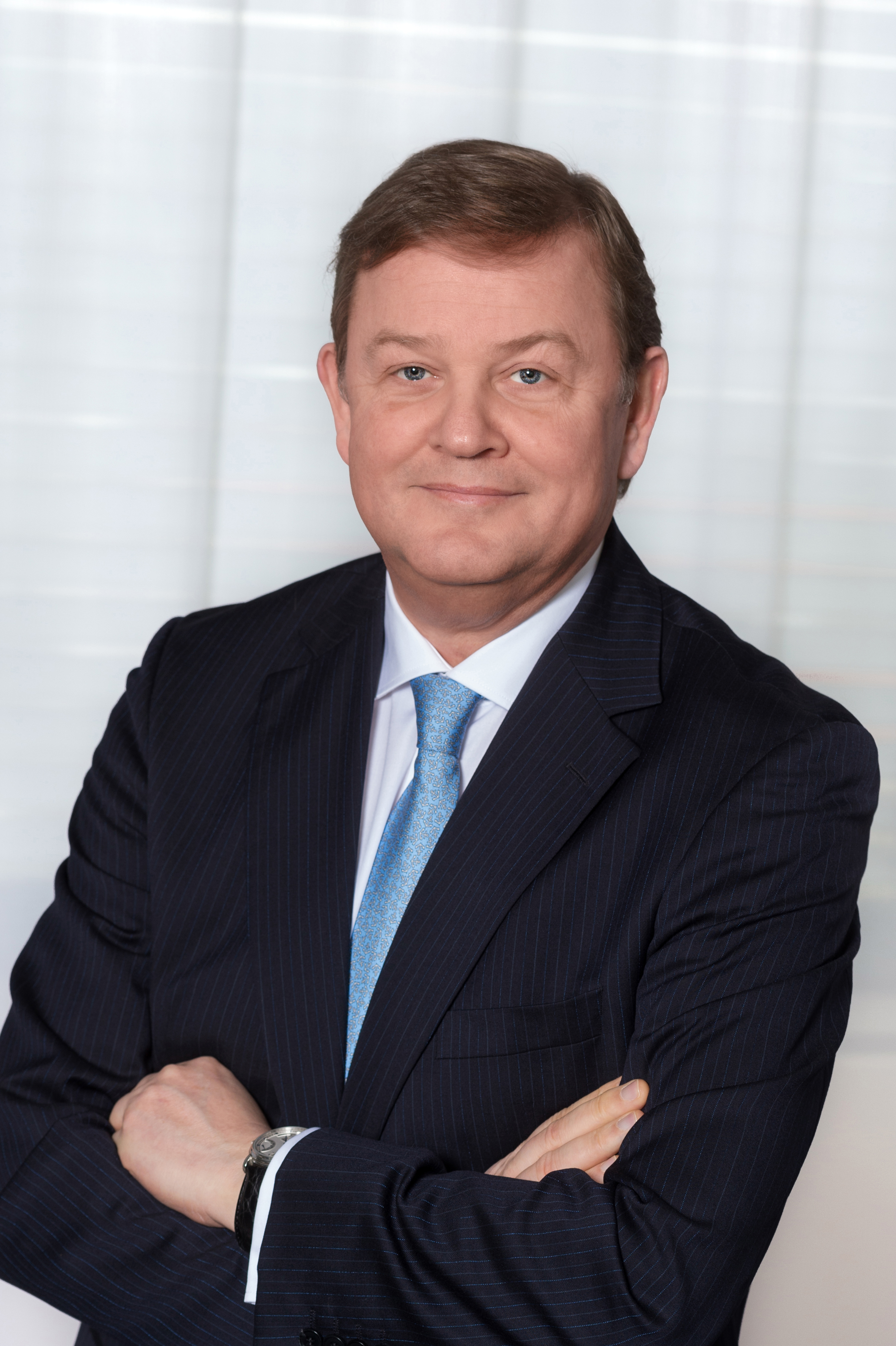
- Born: Nieuw-Loosdrecht, Netherlands
- Education: Utrecht University (MSc); Erasmus University Rotterdam (MBA)
- Occupation: Business executive
- Known for: CEO of Royal DSM (2007–2020)

Feike Sijbesma is a Dutch business executive who was CEO and chairman of the managing board of DSM from 2007 until 2020. And in 2022, he was nominated as honorary chairman. He helped the Dutch government from March to September 2020 as special voluntary corona envoy, especially focused on testing policy and availability. From mid 2020, Sijbesma focuses on several board positions (among others chairman of Philips and Unilever) and the African malnutrition issue and climate (adaptation).

== Early life and education ==
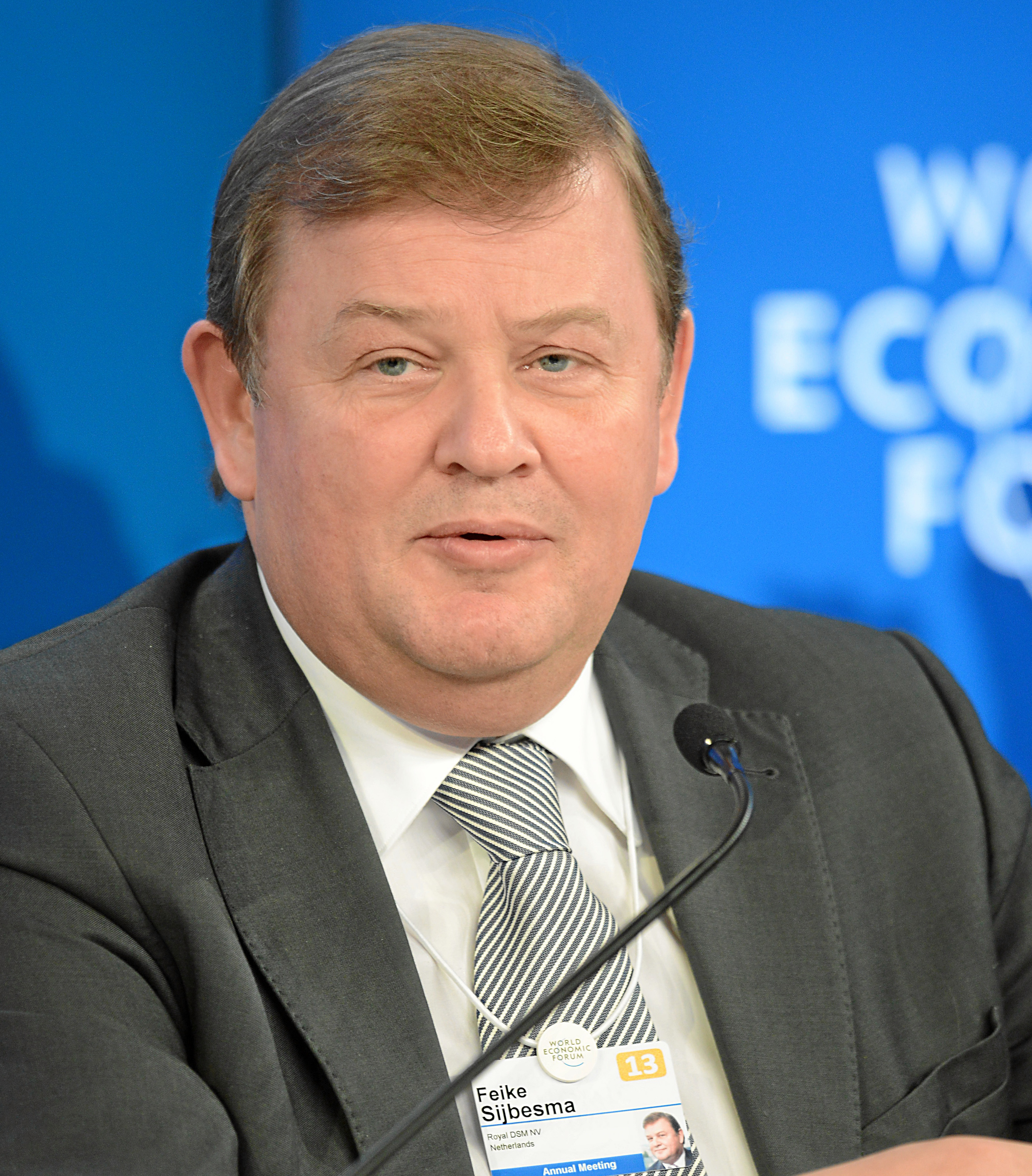
Sijbesma during the WEF 2013

Sijbesma was born in Nieuw-Loosdrecht, Netherlands. His father was an insurance agent. Sijbesma graduated with a Master of Science in molecular and medical biology from Utrecht University and a Master of Business Administration from Erasmus University Rotterdam.

== Career ==
=== Career in the private sector ===
After graduating from Erasmus University Rotterdam in 1987, Sijbesma started his career in the pharmaceuticals division of the Dutch biotechnology company, Gist-brocades NV. First in strategy, then business development and accordingly as Director Marketing & Sales. In 1993, he was appointed general manager of the Savoury Business Unit at Gist-brocades. Two years later, he was appointed to the company's executive committee. In 1995 he became director of the Food Specialties Division of Gist-brocades. In 1998, Gist-brocades was acquired by Royal DSM. After the merger, Sijbesma became the director of DSM Food Specialties.

In 2000, Sijbesma joined the Managing Board of Directors (Executive Committee) at DSM as the company shifted toward nutrition and biotech. In 2002/2003 Sijbesma led from Basel (Switzerland) the acquisition of Roche Vitamins & Fine Chemicals, which changed DSM drastically. In May 2007, he was named CEO of the company and Chairman of the Managing Board. As DSM CEO, Sijbesma transformed the company into a life science and material science company. The company sold its petrochemical and bulk-chemical businesses, as well as its pharmaceutical units. During that time, Sijbesma also oversaw 25 major acquisitions for the company. Additionally, Sijbesma brought DSM into a partnership with the United Nations' World Food Programme (WFP) to provide food assistance to tens of millions of people via WFP. Sijbesma also founded Africa Improved Foods addressing hunger in Africa via local manufacturing, starting in Rwanda In 2010, Sijbesma was given the United Nations Humanitarian of the Year award.

In 2016, Sijbesma was named Co-Chair of the High Level Assembly of the Carbon Pricing Leadership Coalition (CPLC) which was convened by the World Bank Group. In 2017, the World Bank Group named him a "Global Climate Leader." He also advocated for widespread corporate and governmental use of carbon pricing in 2017.

Early 2020, after 13 years at the helm, Sijbesma handed over the CEO ship of DSM to his successors, Dimitri de Vreeze and Geraldine Matchett as co-CEO's, whilst Sijbesma was named as honorary chair of DSM. Under Sijbesma's leadership DSM transformed from a bulk-chemical company into one focused at nutrition, health and sustainable living.

=== Later career ===
In 2020, the International Monetary Fund's Managing Director Kristalina Georgieva appointed Sijbesma to an external advisory group to provide input on policy challenges. Amid the COVID-19 pandemic in the Netherlands, he was asked to support the Dutch government's special envoy on the pandemic response in early 2020, especially focused on testing.

Since mid-2020, Sijbesma focuses on several boards (a.o. chairman of Royal Philips and Unilever), as well as climate (adaptation). He co-chairs with former UN SG Ban Ki-moon the Global Center on Adaptation (GCA). In 2023, United Nations Secretary-General António Guterres appointed Sijbesma as one of 22 members of the Scaling Up Nutrition (SUN) Movement's lead group.

== Other activities ==
=== Corporate boards ===
- Philips, Chairman of the Supervisory Board (since 2021)
- Unilever, Non-executive Member of the Board

=== Non-profit organizations ===
- World Economic Forum (WEF), Member of the Board of Trustees
- De Nederlandsche Bank, Member of the Supervisory Board
- Co-chair Global Center of Adaptation (GCA)
- Scaling Up Nutrition Movement (SUN), Member of the Lead Group and founder/co-chair of the SUN Business Network (since 2016, appointed by United Nations Secretary-General Ban Ki-moon), also supporting Unicef's GenU.
- Senior Advisor The Ocean Cleanup
- Senior Advisor African Improved Foods (AIF)

== Awards ==
- Humanitarian of the year United Nations (2010)
- Leaders of Change UN (2011)
- George Washington Carver Biotech Awards (2011)
- Honorary doctorate University Maastricht (2012)
- Sustainable Ribbon (2016)
- Most influential Dutchman Volkskrant (2018) (and in top 3 from 2017-2020)
- Fortune – world's 50 greatest leaders (#44) (2018)
- Harvard Business Review – 50 most successful CEO's (#42) (2019)
- Honorary doctorate University of Groningen(2020)
- Nominated as Grand Officer in the order of Orange Nassau (2021)
- The Netherlands America Foundation: Adams – Van Berckel Award (2022)
