= Breukeleveen =

- Hamlet
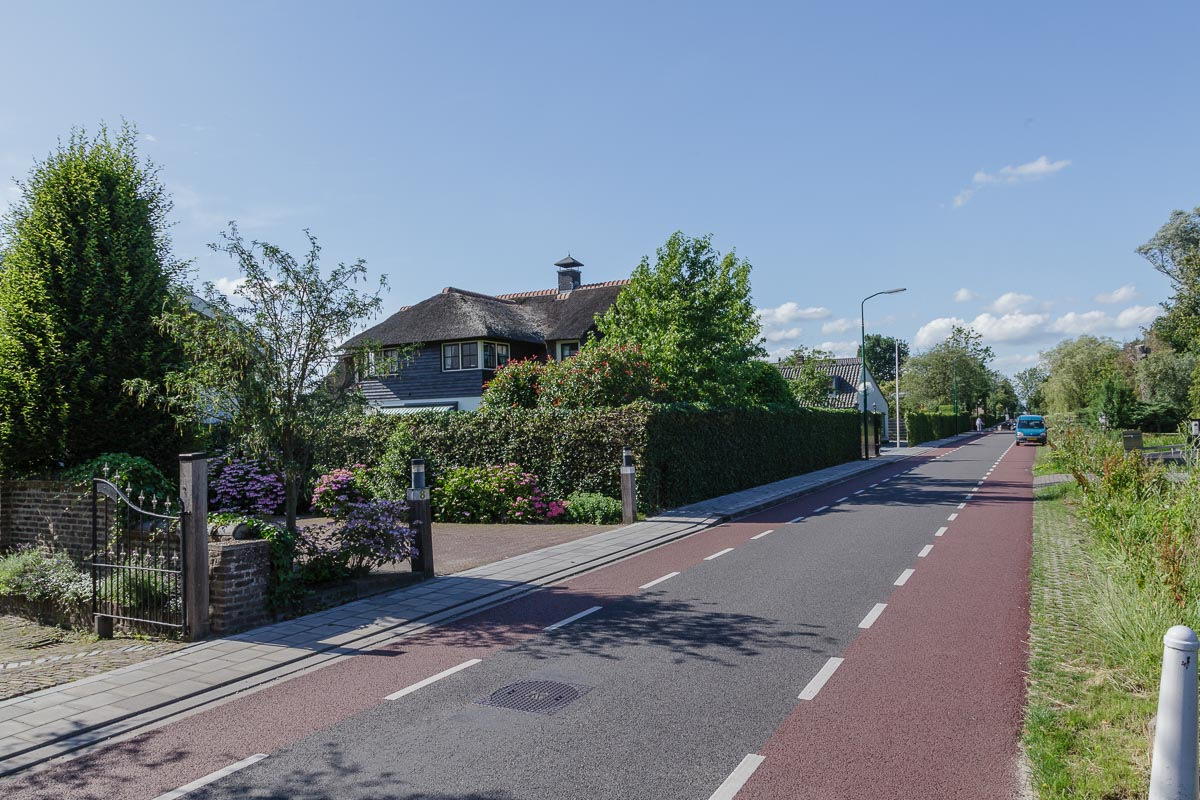
- Farm in Breukeleveen

- Location in the Netherlands Location in the province of North Holland in the Netherlands
- Coordinates: 52°12′N 5°5′E
- Country: Netherlands
- Province: North Holland
- Municipality: Wijdemeren

Area
  - Total: 15.58 km^{2} (6.02 sq mi)
- Elevation: −0.4 m (−1.3 ft)

Population (2021)
  - Total: 200
  - Density: 13/km^{2} (33/sq mi)
- Time zone: UTC+1 (CET)
  - Summer (DST): UTC+2 (CEST)
- Postal code: 3625
- Dialing code: 035

Breukeleveen is a hamlet in the Dutch province of North Holland. It is in the municipality of Wijdemeren, and lies southwest of Loosdrecht.

The hamlet consists of a single street between two lakes. At the north end, it borders the hamlet of Muyeveld, and on the south end it borders Tienhoven, Stichtse Vecht, in the province of Utrecht.

The hamlet is named after the nearby town of Breukelen.
