= Nederhorst den Berg =

- Village
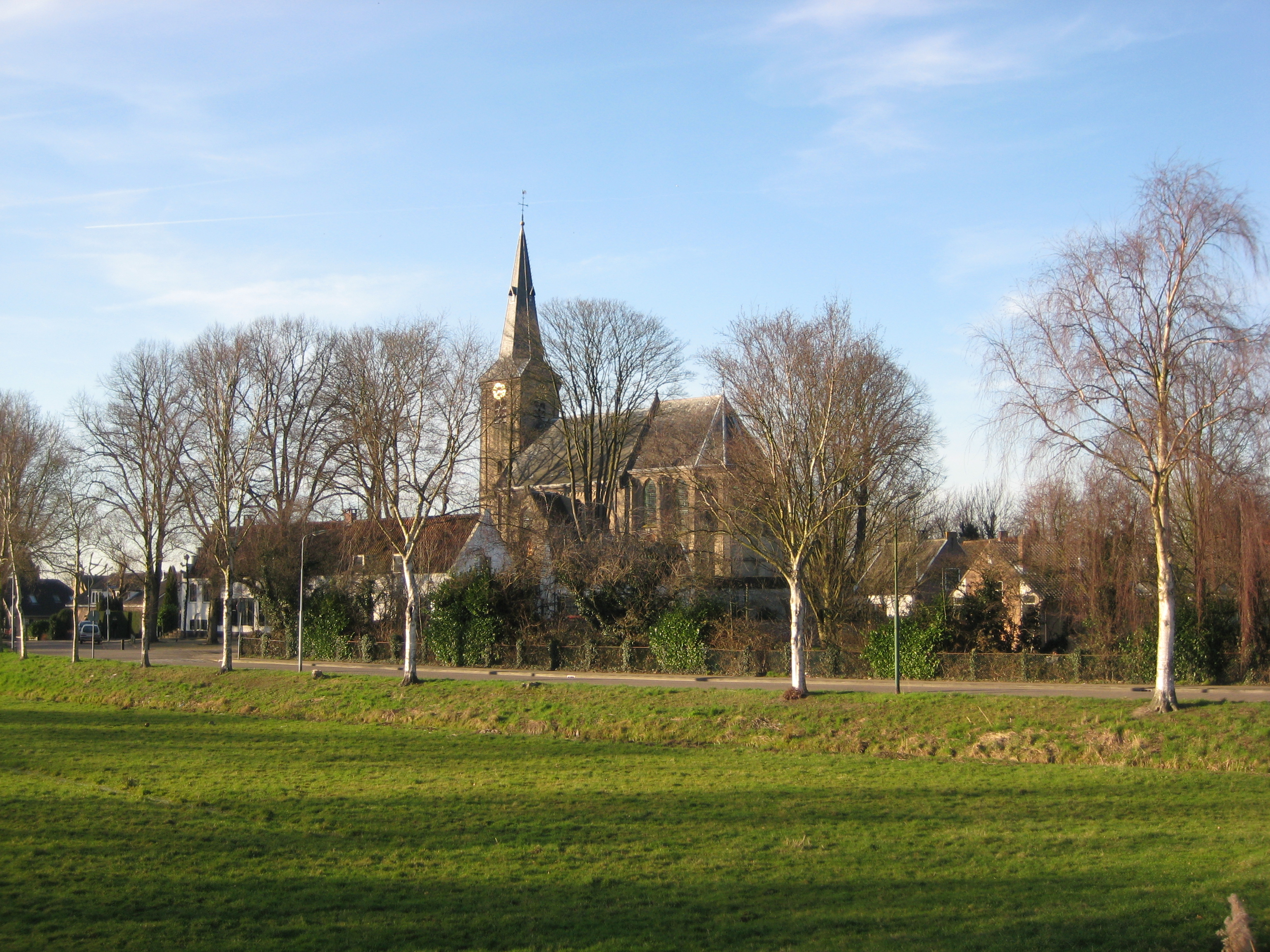
- Nederhorst den Berg, 2008

- Flag

- Location in the Netherlands Location in the province of North Holland in the Netherlands
- Coordinates: 52°16′N 5°3′E
- Country: Netherlands
- Province: North Holland
- Municipality: Wijdemeren

Area
  - Total: 14.67 km^{2} (5.66 sq mi)
- Elevation: −0.7 m (−2.3 ft)

Population (2021)
  - Total: 5,560
  - Density: 379/km^{2} (982/sq mi)
- Time zone: UTC+1 (CET)
  - Summer (DST): UTC+2 (CEST)
- Postal code: 1394
- Dialing code: 0294

Nederhorst den Berg (Dutch pronunciation: [ˈneːdərɦɔrs dɛm ˈbɛr(ə)x]) is a village in the province of North Holland, Netherlands. It lies about 8 km northwest of Hilversum in the Vechtstreek area, near the Vecht river. Until 1 January 2002, it was a separate municipality; it is now part of the municipality of Wijdemeren.

The village was first mentioned in 1326 as "opten berch", and means "lower height with growth". Neder (lower) could have been added to distinguish from the former castle Hoogerhorst aan de Eem. The height refers to a 5-metre-high (16 ft) sandy ridge. Nederhorst den Berg is a peat excavation settlement from the Early Middle Ages. It used to be part of Utrecht, but was transferred to North Holland in 1819.

In the 13th century, Nederhorst den Berg Castle was built with octagon corner towers and surrounded by a moat. In 1635, the castle was enlarged and the courtyard was built over. The castle was destroyed by the French in 1672. In 1695, it was rebuilt. The castle burnt down in 1971, and was rebuilt in 1973.

The Dutch Reformed Willibrordus Church has a 12th-century tower.
