= Oud-Loosdrecht =

- Village
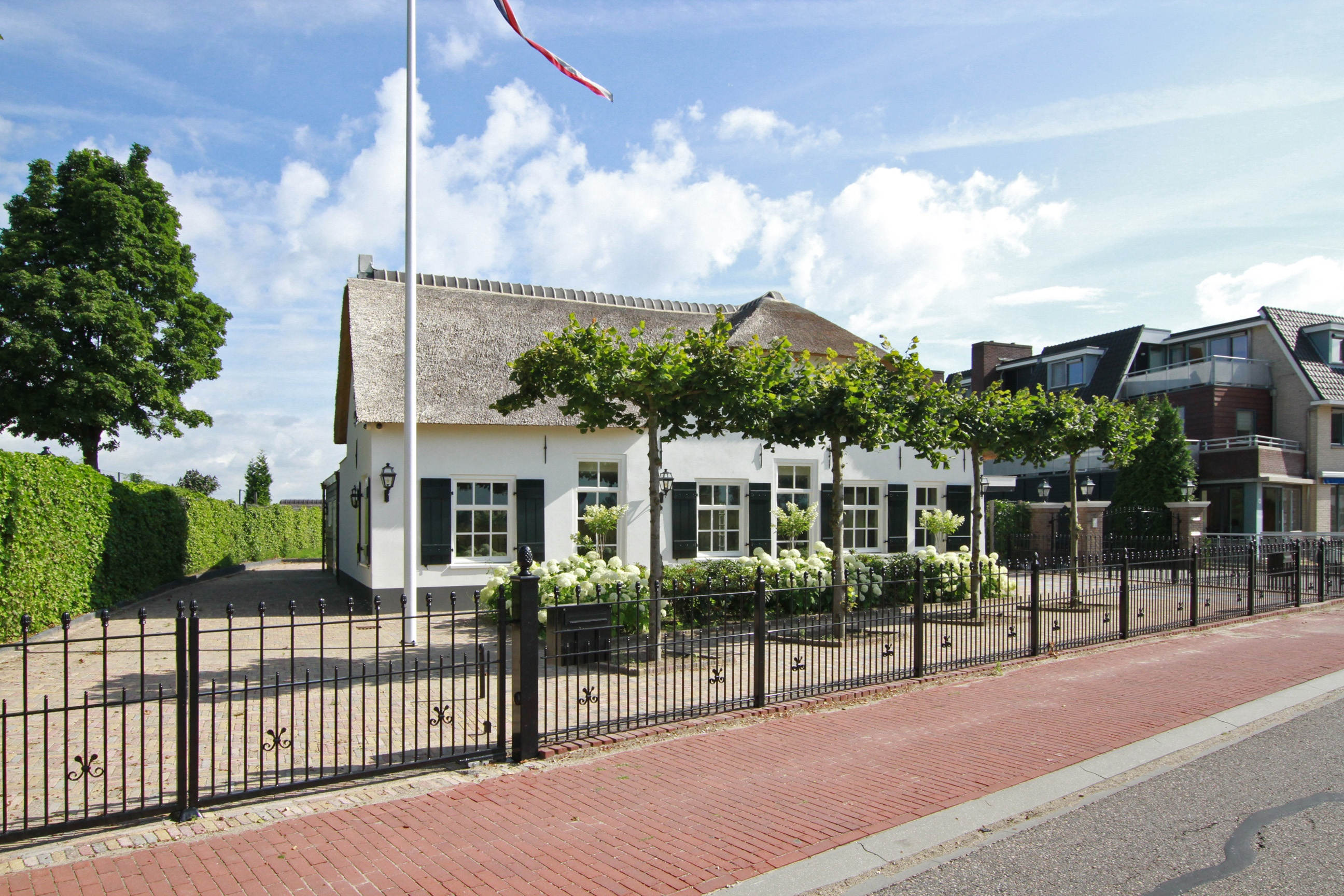
- Monument in Oud-Loosdrecht

- Location in the Netherlands Location in the province of North Holland in the Netherlands
- Coordinates: 52°12′N 5°5′E
- Country: Netherlands
- Province: North Holland
- Municipality: Wijdemeren

Area
  - Total: 15.58 km^{2} (6.02 sq mi)
- Elevation: 0.4 m (1.3 ft)

Population (2021)
  - Total: 2,205
  - Density: 141.5/km^{2} (366.6/sq mi)
- Time zone: UTC+1 (CET)
  - Summer (DST): UTC+2 (CEST)
- Postal code: 1231
- Dialing code: 035

Oud-Loosdrecht is a village in the province of North Holland, Netherlands. It is a part of the town of Loosdrecht and the municipality of Wijdemeren; it lies about six kilometres (3.7 mi) west of Hilversum.

== History ==
The village was first mentioned in 1384 as "van der Loesdrecht". The current name means 'old ferry over the drainage canal'. Oud ('old') was added to distinguish it from Nieuw-Loosdrecht.

It contains a large amount of Rijksmonumenten.

== Gallery ==
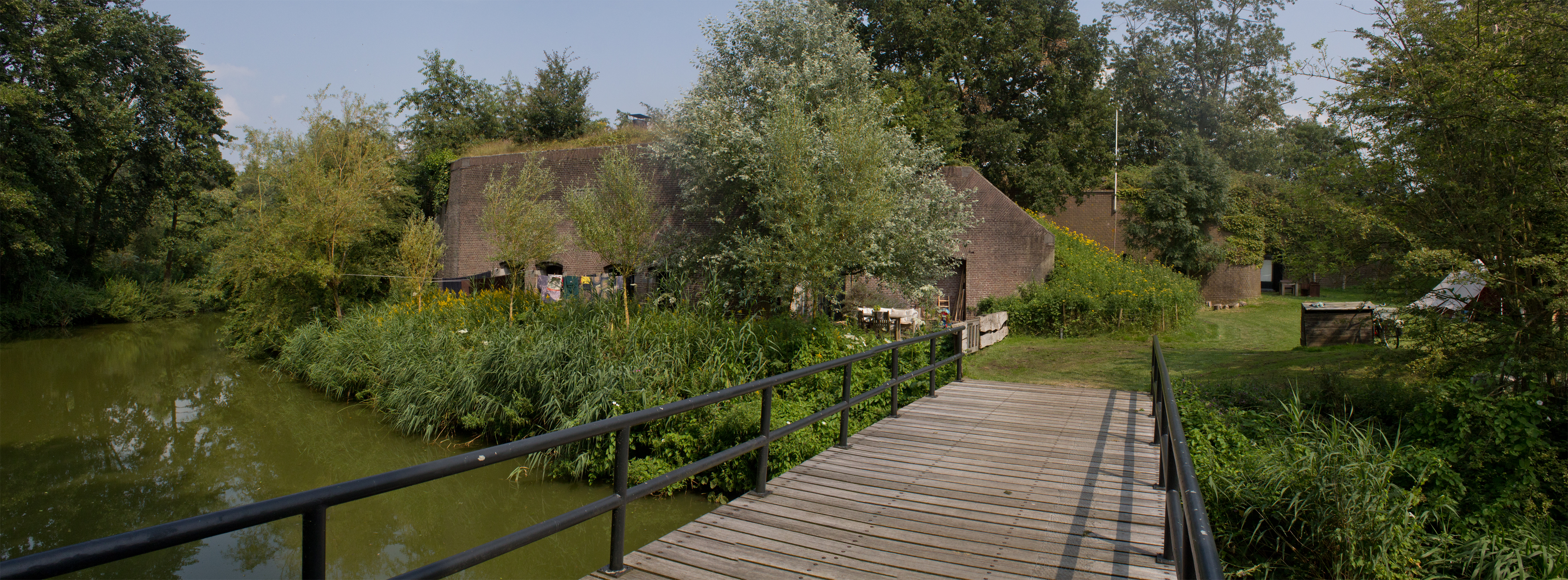
Fort Spion

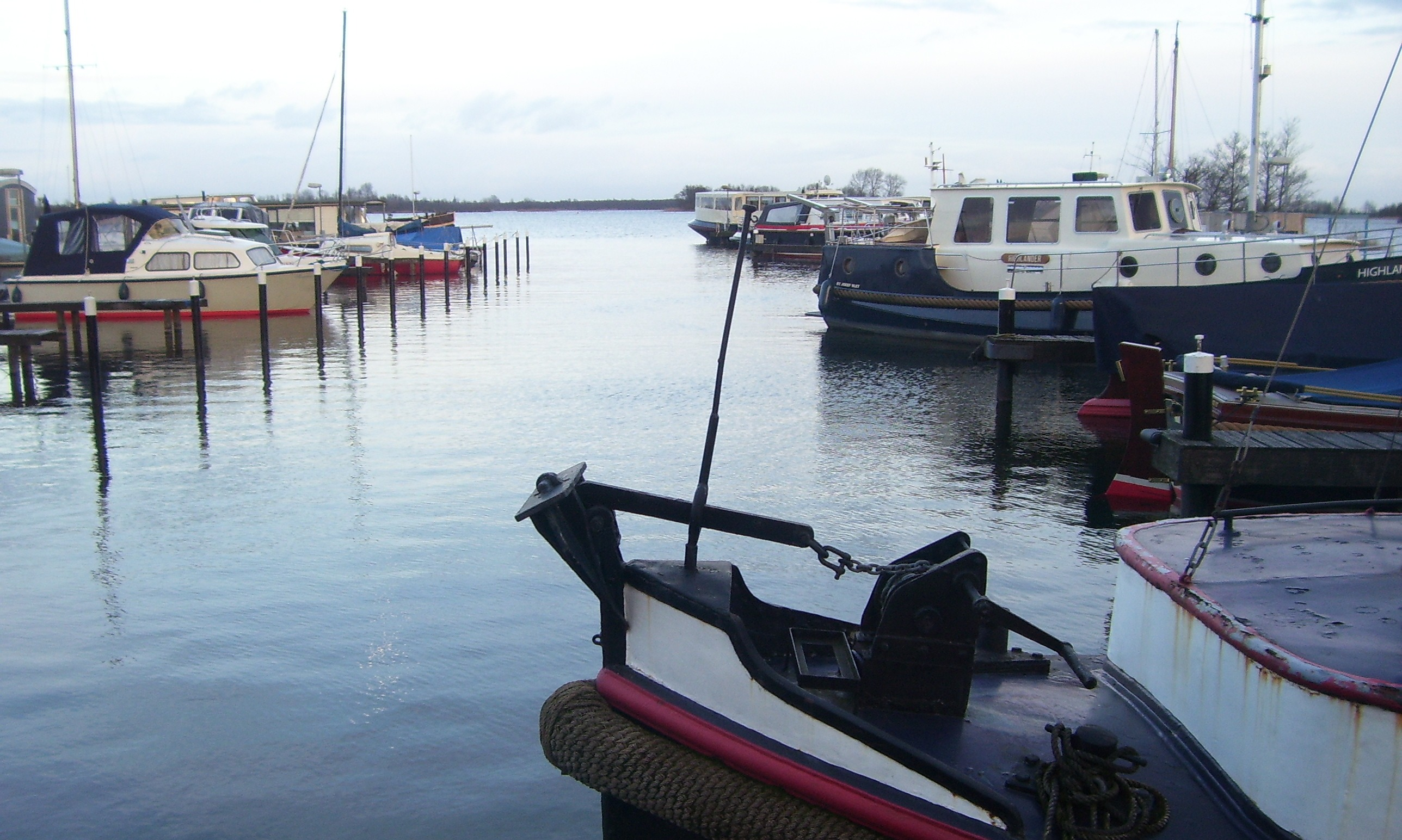
View on Loosdrechtse Plassen lake along the Veendijk

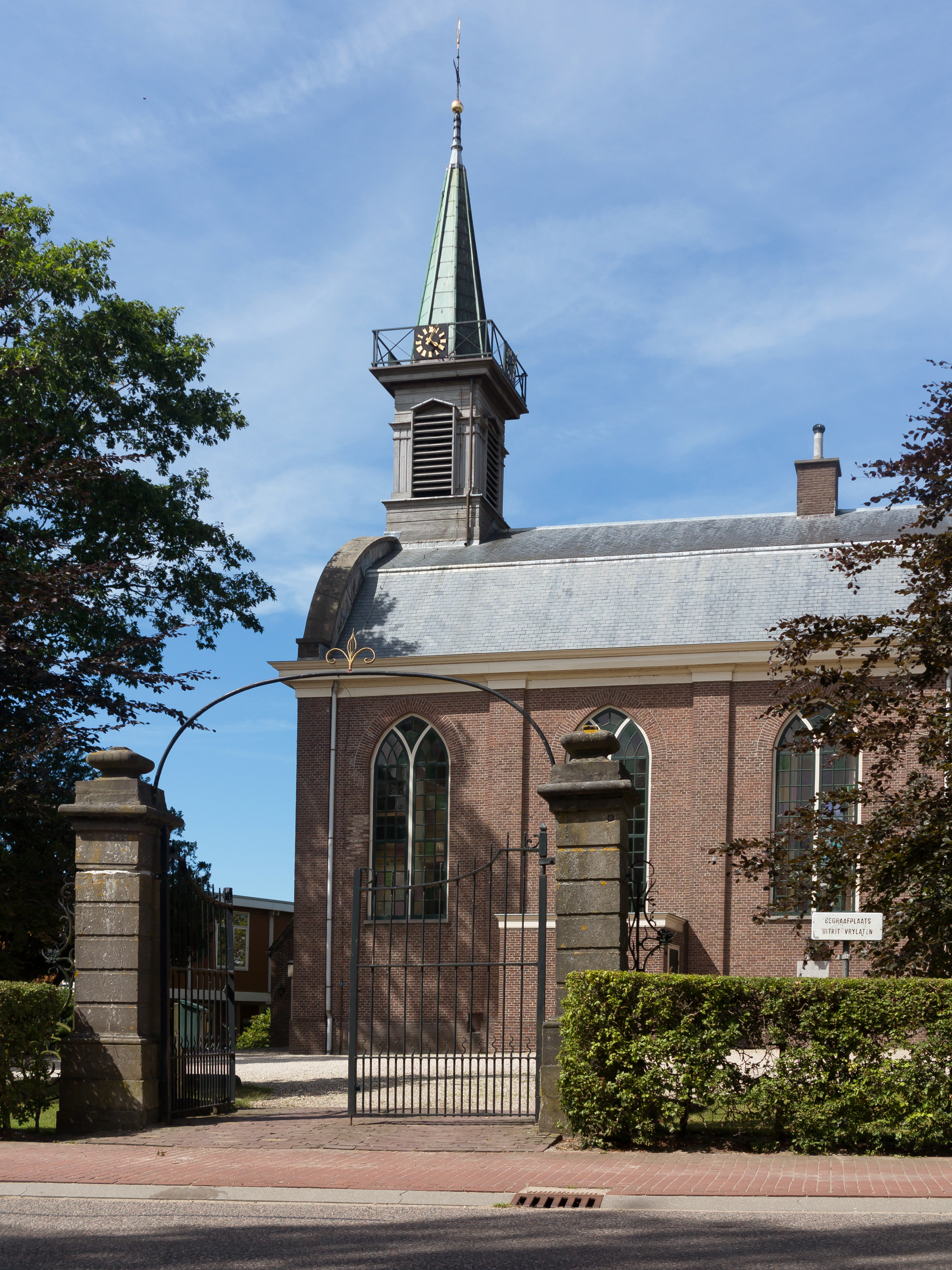
Church of Oud-Loosdrecht

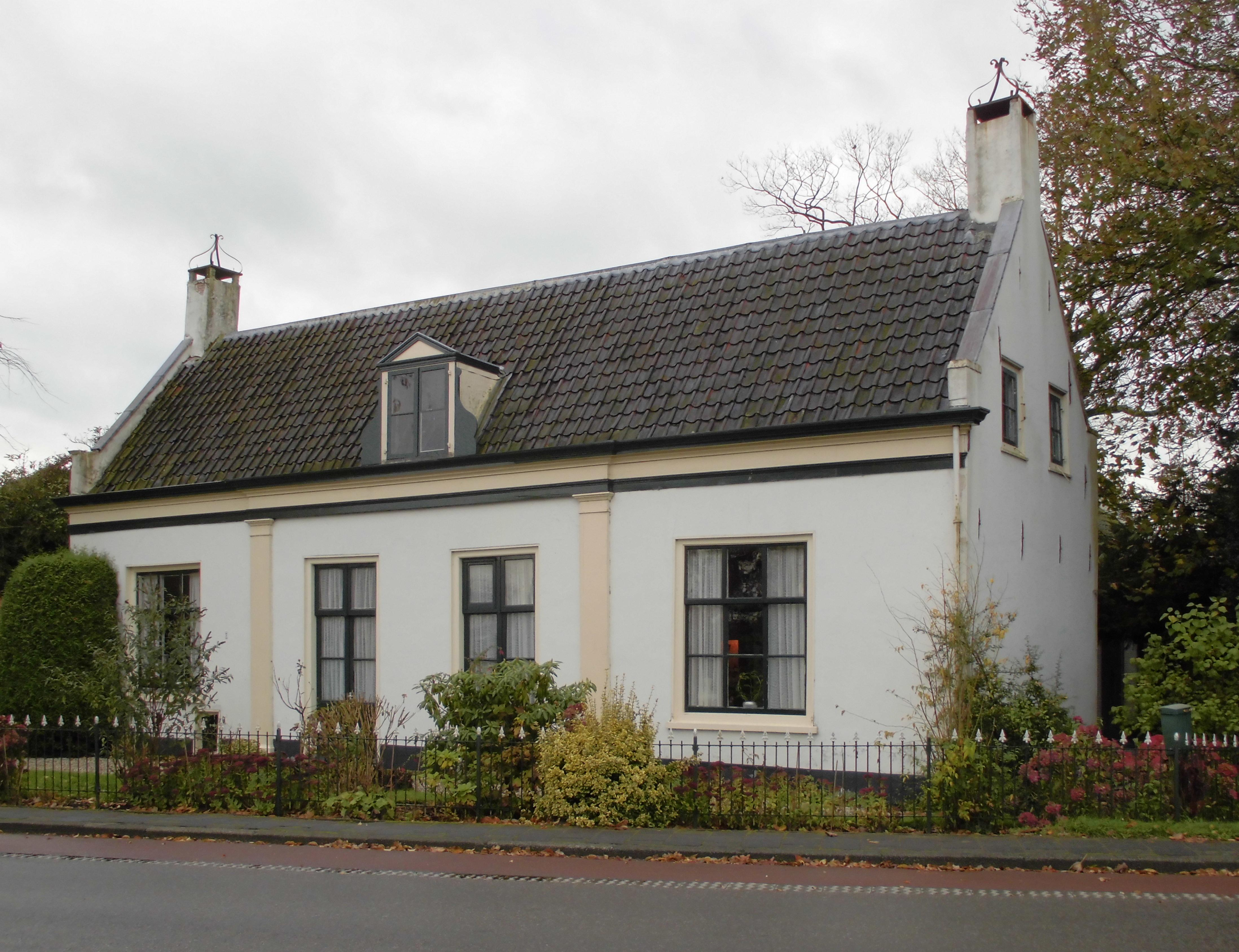
Rijksmonument on the Oud-Loosdrechtsedijk
