= Nieuw-Loosdrecht =

- Village
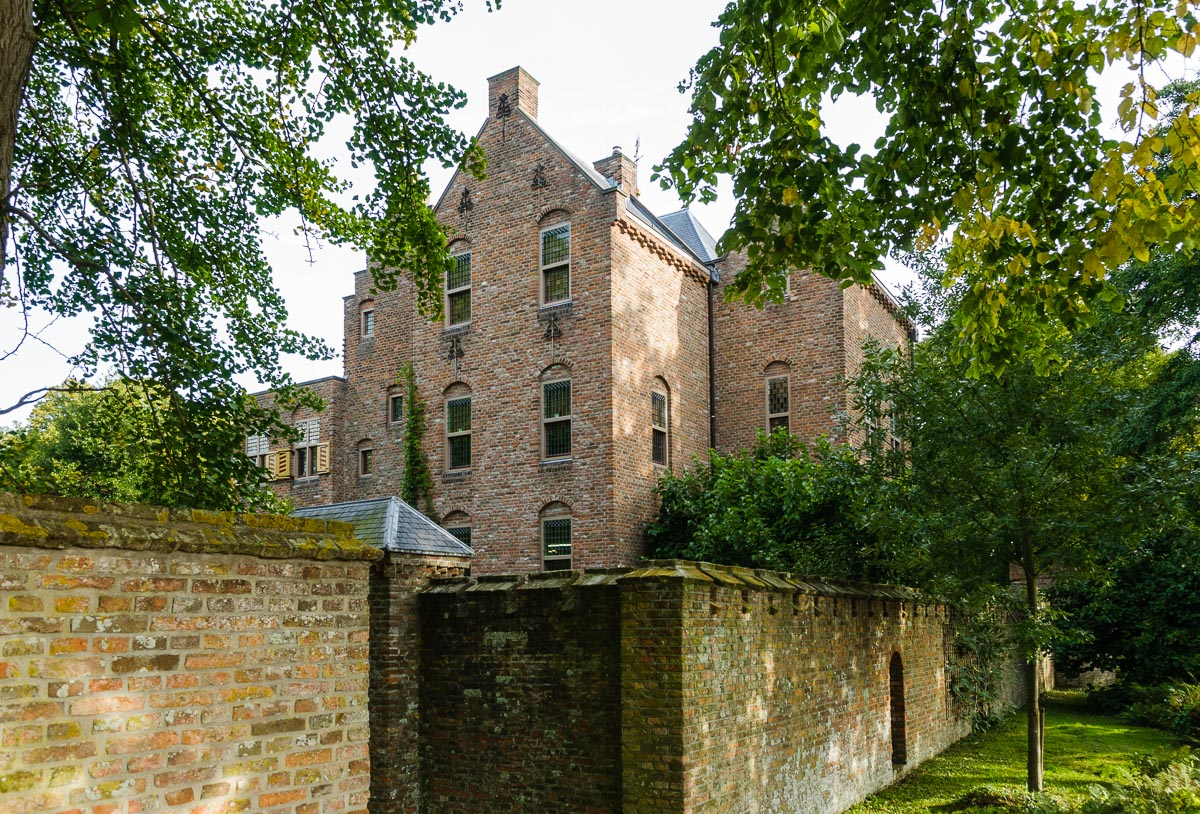
- Sypesteyn Castle

- Location in the Netherlands Location in the province of North Holland in the Netherlands
- Coordinates: 52°12′N 5°8′E
- Country: Netherlands
- Province: North Holland
- Municipality: Wijdemeren

Area
  - Total: 11.79 km^{2} (4.55 sq mi)
- Elevation: 0.4 m (1.3 ft)

Population (2021)
  - Total: 6,950
  - Density: 589/km^{2} (1,530/sq mi)
- Time zone: UTC+1 (CET)
  - Summer (DST): UTC+2 (CEST)
- Postal code: 1231
- Dialing code: 035

Nieuw-Loosdrecht is a village in the province of North Holland, Netherlands. It is a part of the town of Loosdrecht and the municipality of Wijdemeren. It lies about 4 km west of Hilversum.

The village was first mentioned in 1415 as "optie aeker, dair nu die Zypkerc op staet". The current name means "new ferry over the drainage canal". Nieuw (new) has been added to distinguish it from Oud-Loosdrecht.

The Dutch Reformed Sijpe Church was built in 1400. Castle Museum Sypesteyn was built in 1911 and 1926 as a replica of the 1568 castle. The museum contains a large art collection. The castle is surrounded by a 17th century park.

== Gallery ==
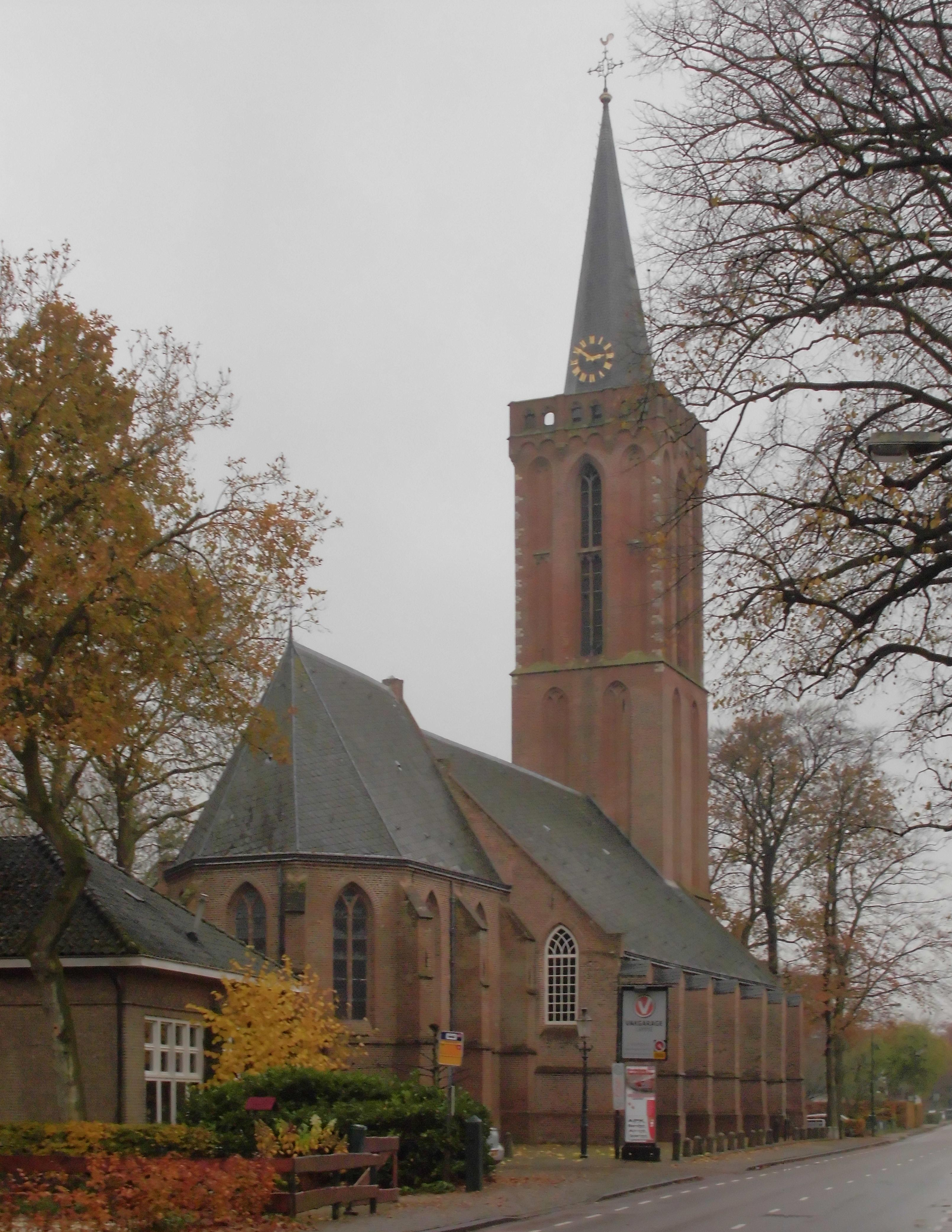
Dutch Reformed church

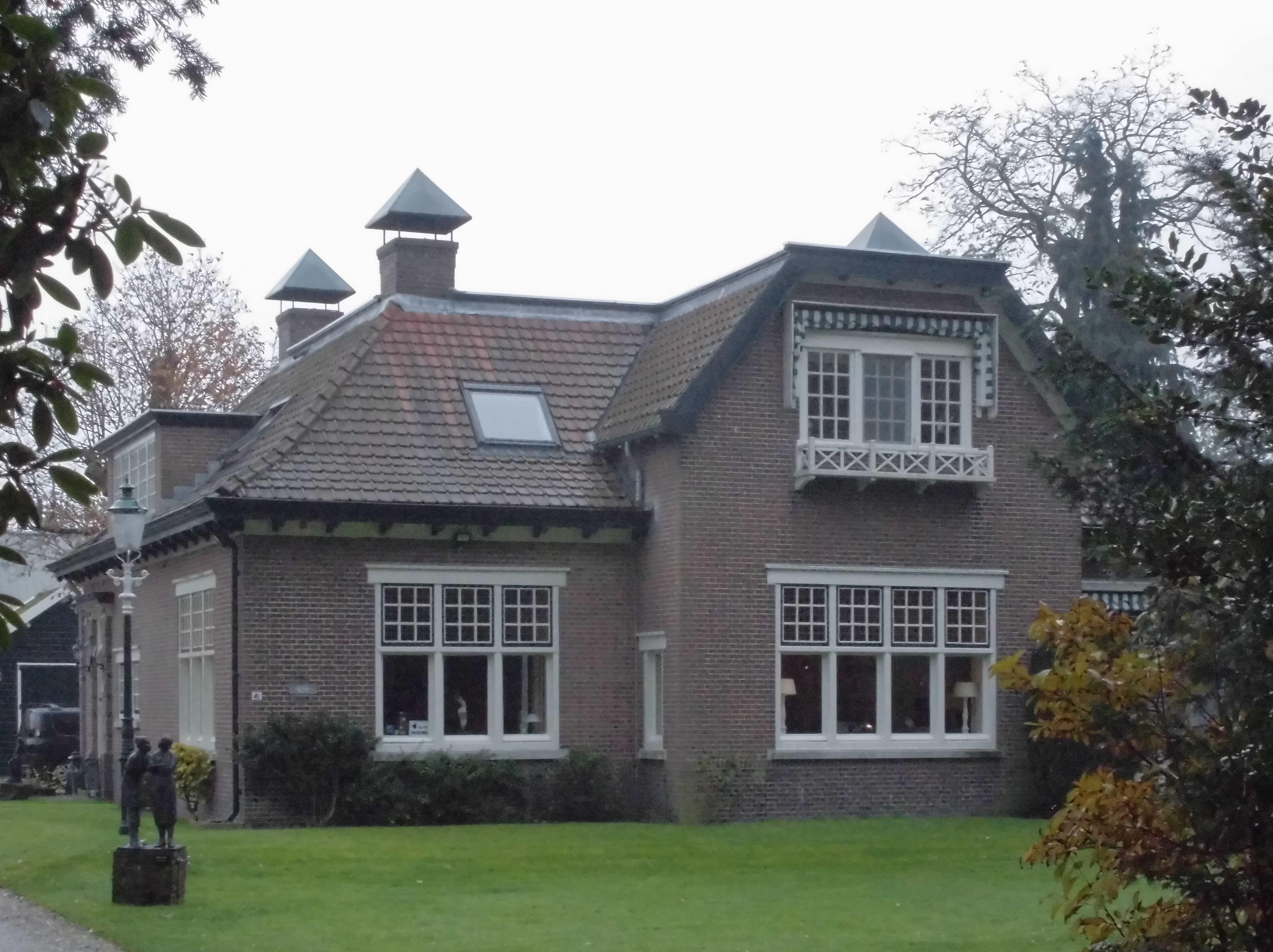
House in Nieuw-Loosdrecht
