= Muyeveld =

- Hamlet
- Location in the Netherlands Location in the province of North Holland in the Netherlands
- Coordinates: 52°11′N 5°4′E
- Country: Netherlands
- Province: North Holland
- Municipality: Wijdemeren

Area
  - Total: 0.69 km^{2} (0.27 sq mi)
- Elevation: 0.4 m (1.3 ft)

Population (2021)
  - Total: 155
  - Density: 220/km^{2} (580/sq mi)
- Time zone: UTC+1 (CET)
  - Summer (DST): UTC+2 (CEST)
- Postal code: 1231
- Dialing code: 035

Muyeveld or Muijeveld is a hamlet in the Dutch province of North Holland. It is a part of the municipality of Wijdemeren, and lies about 8 km southwest of Hilversum.

According to Van der Aa, the hamlet was formerly known as "Mijndenveld", referring to the nearby polder and hamlet of Mijnden.
