= Capture of Noirmoutier =

Part of the Franco-Dutch War

- Part of the Franco-Dutch War
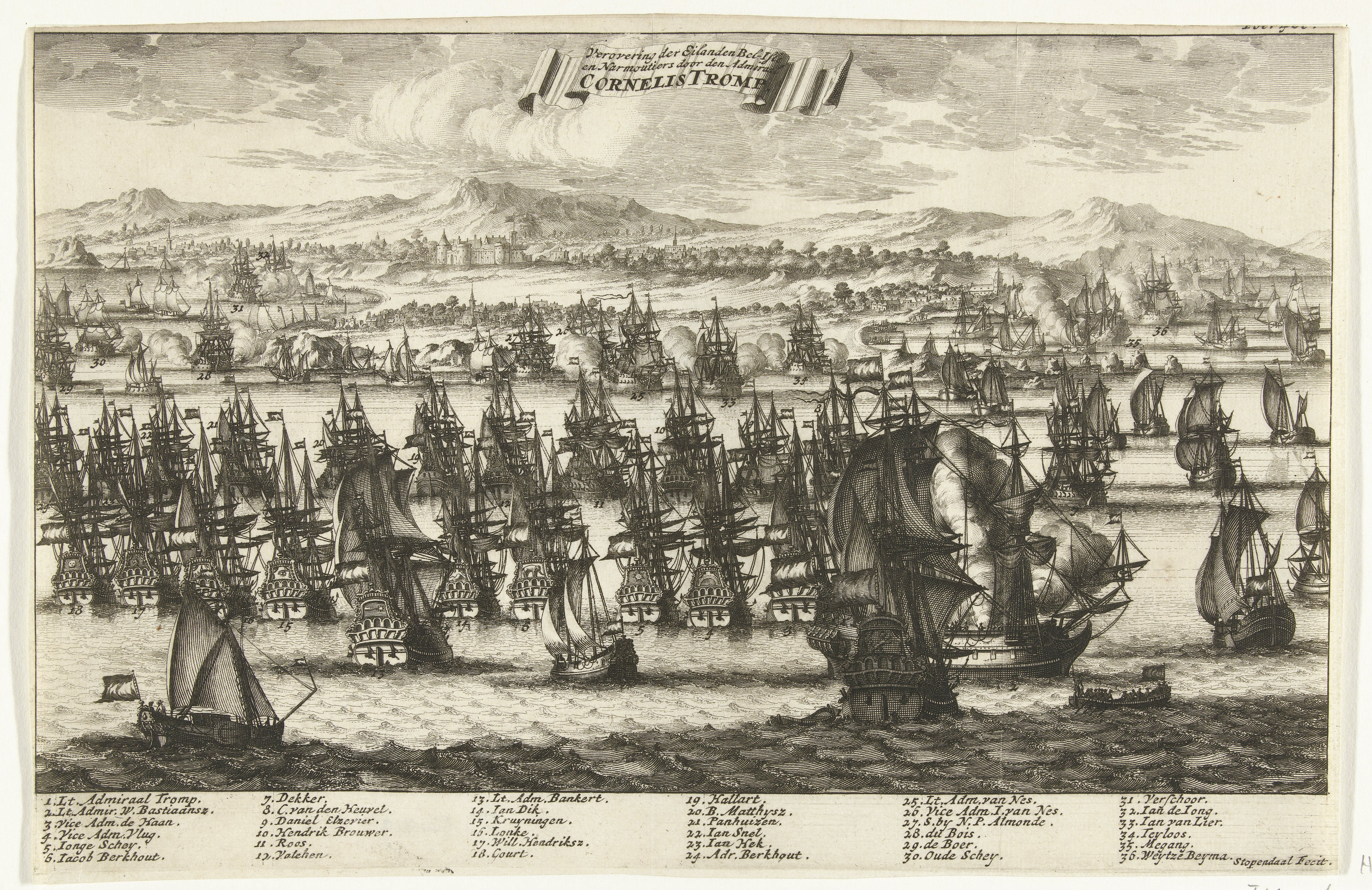
- Capture of Noirmoutier by Bastiaen Stopendael
Date	4 July 1674
Location	Noirmoutier, France
Result	Dutch victory

Belligerents
France	Dutch Republic

Commanders and leaders
	Cornelis Tromp

Strength
800 soldiers 6,000 Armed farmers another regiment of 400 people 30 canons unknown number of ships	40 ships 3,200 soldiers(100 or more did not participate in the landing)

Casualties and losses
1 Frigate captured 2 other Vessels; Unknown number of Fishing boats Unknown number of other ships unknown number of dead	8–10 dead, 40–45 wounded 45 dead, 65 wounded (Sources differ)

The Capture of Noirmoutier took place on 4 July 1674 when a fleet under Cornelis Tromp captured, and occupied the island of Noirmoutier.

== Background ==
Following the outbreak of the Franco-Dutch War and the subsequent French invasion of the Dutch Republic in 1672, the French forces were eventually expelled at the end of 1673. This turn of events enabled the Dutch to transition to an offensive stance. In pursuit of this strategy, a fleet led by Cornelis Tromp was deployed to sow chaos along the French coastline.

== Capture, and occupation ==
On July 2, they set sail for Noirmoutier, and they reached their destination on July 3. The island's strategic location, situated not far from the mouth of the Loire River, they scouted the island with a sloop. Following a council of war, a decision was made to execute the landing on the following day, July 4, with the naval fleet providing protective cover. Noirmoutier Island, defended by a substantial force of 800 French soldiers, 30 cannon, numerous ships, 6000 Armed farmers, and another regiment of 400 French bore witness to the arrival of the Dutch forces.

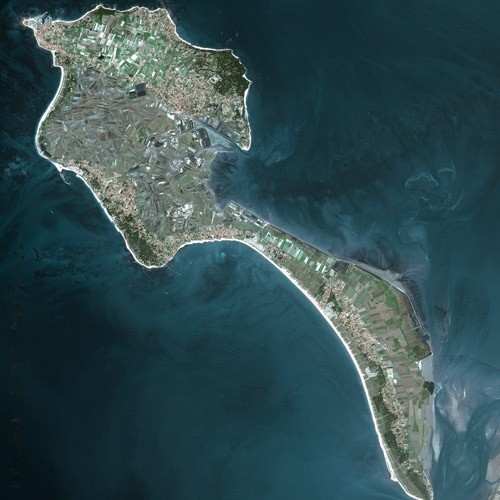
Photo of Noirmoutier from a satellite

Upon the ships' arrival at the shore, a vigorous assault was launched. Dutch soldiers leaped overboard and waded through the water to the island. The initial success was further solidified by the deployment of additional sloops, which helped overcome the French defense swiftly. The French forces retreated to Poitou through a narrow creek passage. Differing historical accounts provide varying numbers of Dutch casualties. One account suggests 8–10 fatalities and 40–45 wounded, while another version reports 45 dead and 65 wounded. Around 7 o'clock in the morning, the Dutch army, led by Van Hoorne, advanced inland. Upon reaching the castle, the French flag was lowered, and the Dutch Prince's Flag was hoisted, symbolizing the successful occupation. The Dutch naval fleet anchored near the windmill, strategically distributing their troops across the island. Amidst rumors of a potential French counteroffensive involving a force of around 5,000 soldiers, reconnaissance missions were launched. These missions led to the swift surrender of two French vessels whose occupants were unaware of the Dutch takeover. Consequently, the surrendered ships yielded their cargo to the victorious Dutch forces.Tromp, along with other admirals, made multiple visits ashore to inspect the soldiers, as some did not adhere to regulations and engaged in prohibited plundering. This resulted in an extensive looting spree where they confiscated belongings from various houses, even going so far as to tear open beds and shake out the feathers. On July 9, six church clocks were seized and transported back to the Dutch Republic, with two of them placed in churches in Oud-Loosdrecht and Kortgene. Instances of extensive looting escalated, prompting Tromp to intervene. When attempts were made by the crew of Jan van Brakel to load goods onto the ships, Tromp fired a warning shot and confiscated the acquired items. On July 15, a fatal incident occurred when Van Hoorne encountered a French civilian attempting stop Van Hoorne to loot his house. Without hesitation, Van Hoorne fatally shot the citizen. Subsequently, 3–4 other Dutch looters were hanged as punishment, an action inconsistent with Dutch policy, despite Tromp's relatively lenient oversight. By July 20, substantial acquisitions including books, hay, wood, and livestock were loaded from the French onto Dutch ships and distributed as spoils. Despite initial reports of a potential 5,000-strong French troop presence, no such force materialized. Tromp dispatched a reconnaissance expedition to scout the sea, which yielded no significant findings but resulted in the capture of one French frigate and several fishing vessels. Following a three-week occupation, Tromp made the decision to depart on July 23. As they left, they destroyed the castle and its defenses, taking with them 18 French as Ransom. A condition for their return was set: the payment of 35,000 guilders. On July 26, the fleet set sail amidst circulating rumors of 10,000 French soldiers coming to retake the islandWhen Van Nes returned to Noirmoutier with the captured French he requested the payment but the citizens told him that tromp gave them 4 months time to pay Van Nes was confused since he never got word of this, his communication with van tromp was not good, he then left.

== Sources ==
- Van Reine, R. Prud'Homme (2001). chittering en schandaal : biografie van Maerten en Cornelis Tromp (in Dutch). Amsterdam : Arbeiderspers. ISBN 9789029535724.
- van Kampen, Pieter Nicolaas (1854). De Gids. Jaargang 18 (in Dutch). 1854.
- de Liefde, Jan (1885). Nederlandsche zeehelden van de zeventiende eeuw. Naar het Engelsch bewerkt onder toezicht van C.H. de Goeje (in Dutch). Leiden E.J. Brill.
