= Franco-Dutch War =

1672–1678 European war

- Part of the wars of Louis XIV
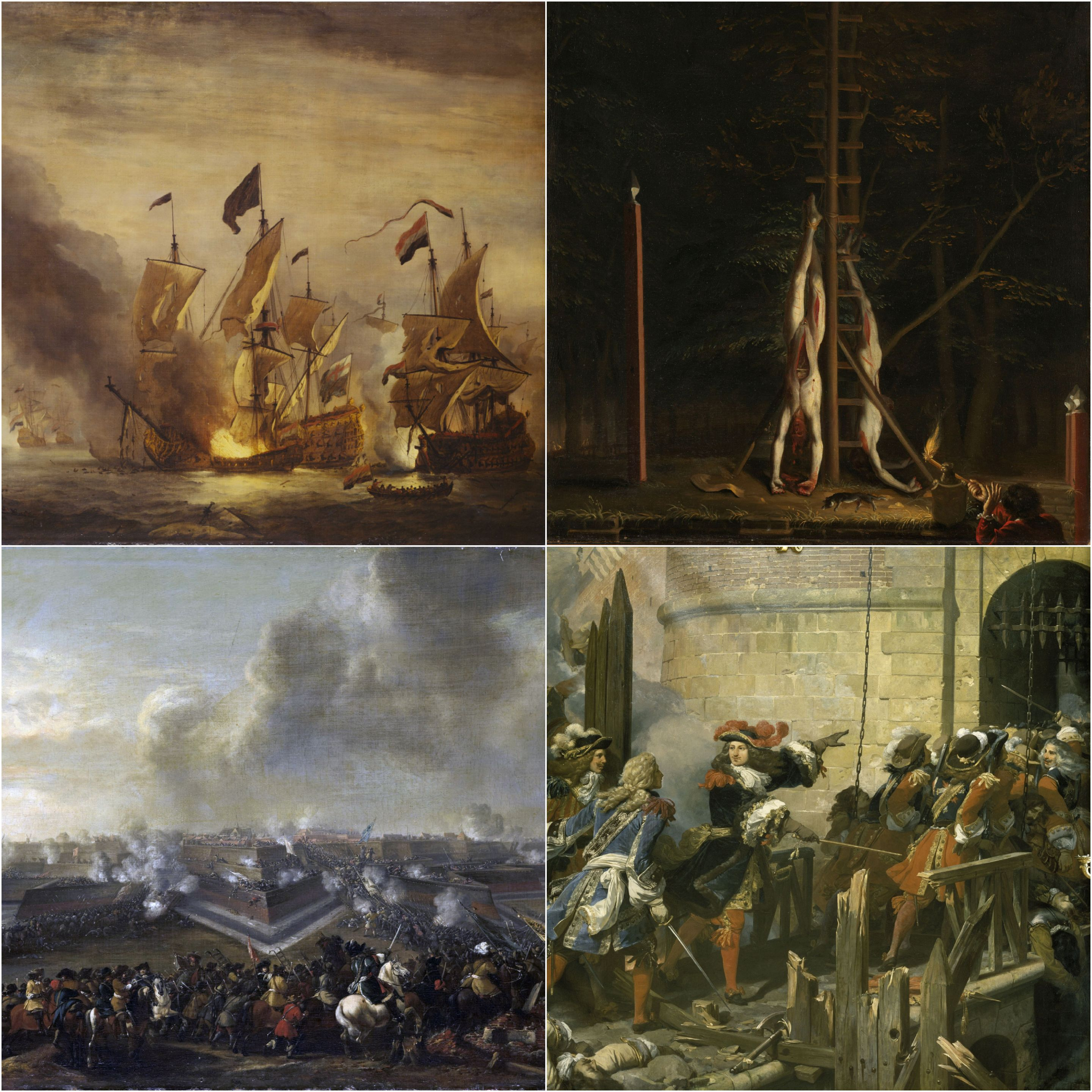
- Left to right: The Battle of Solebay; The murder of the De Witt brothers; The Capture of Coevorden; The Siege of Valenciennes
Date	6 April 1672 – 17 September 1678
Location	Western Europe, Mediterranean Sea, Atlantic Ocean, and East Indies
Result	Treaties of Nijmegen
Territorial changes	France gains Franche-Comté, Ypres, Maubeuge, Câteau-Cambrésis, Valenciennes, Saint-Omer, Cassel, Lorraine, Freiburg, and Kehl; Spain regains Ath and Charleroi; Holy Roman Empire regains Philippsburg

Belligerents
France; England (1672–1674); Münster (1672–1674); Cologne (1672–1674); (yes) Swedish Empire (from 1674)	Dutch Republic; Holy Roman Empire (from 1673); Habsburg Spain (from 1673); Brandenburg-Prussia (from 1673); Lorraine (from 1673); Denmark-Norway (from 1674); England (1678)

Commanders and leaders
Louis XIV; Louvois; Turenne †; Condé; Luxembourg; Créquy; Vauban; Schomberg; Estrées; Duquesne; Charles II of England; York; Rupert; (yes) Charles XI; (yes) Carl Gustaf Wrangel; Maximilian Henry; Bernhard von Galen	William III of Orange; De Witt X; (Dutch Republic) De Ruyter †; (Dutch Republic) Nassau-Siegen; (Dutch Republic) Rabenhaupt; (Dutch Republic) Aylva; (Dutch Republic) Tromp; Leopold I; Montecuccoli; Bournonville; (Margraviate of Brandenburg) Frederick William; (Lorraine) Charles IV; (Lorraine) Charles V; Charles II of Spain; Mariana of Austria; Villahermosa; San Germán; Christian V; Niels Juel

Strength
253,000 (peak); 30,000	80,000; 132,350 (annual average) (Note: 66,510 Imperial, 65,840 Habsburg); 25,000; 30,000 (peak)

Casualties and losses
120,000 killed or wounded	100,000 killed or wounded

The Franco-Dutch War, (Note: also known as the Dutch War, or French: Guerre de Hollande; Dutch: Hollandse Oorlog) 1672 to 1678, was primarily fought by France and the Dutch Republic, with both sides backed at different times by a variety of allies. Related conflicts include the Third Anglo-Dutch War of 1672 to 1674 and the Scanian War of 1675 to 1679.

In May 1672, France nearly overran the Netherlands, an event remembered in Dutch history as the Rampjaar, or "Disaster Year". However, by late July the position had stabilised, while concern over French gains brought the Dutch support from Emperor Leopold I, Spain and Brandenburg-Prussia. Previously an ally of France, England exited the war in February 1674.

Now facing a war of attrition on several fronts, Louis XIV of France instead focused on strengthening French borders with the Spanish Netherlands and Rhineland, while a coalition led by William of Orange sought to minimise any losses. By 1677, France had occupied Franche-Comté and made gains in the Spanish Netherlands and Alsace, but neither side was able to achieve a decisive victory.

France failed to conquer the Dutch Republic; but the September 1678 Peace of Nijmegen is still often seen as the high point of French power in this period. Spain recovered Charleroi from France, but in return ceded Franche-Comté, as well as much of Artois and Hainaut. Under William of Orange, the Dutch regained all the territory lost at the beginning, making him dominant in domestic politics. This position helped him create the anti-French Grand Alliance that fought in the Nine Years' War (1688-1697), and the subsequent War of the Spanish Succession (1701-1714).

== Origins ==
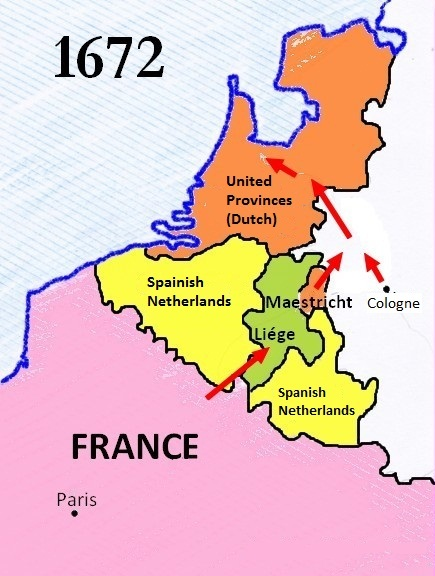
The planned 1672 French offensive; the alliance with Münster and Cologne allowed them to bypass the Spanish Netherlands, marching through Liege, and attack the Dutch from the relatively unguarded east.

As part of a general policy of opposition to Habsburg power in Europe, France backed the Dutch Republic during the 1568 to 1648 Eighty Years War against Spain. The 1648 Peace of Münster confirmed Dutch independence and permanently closed the Scheldt estuary, benefiting Amsterdam by eliminating its rival, Antwerp. Preserving this monopoly was a Dutch priority, but this increasingly clashed with French aims in the Spanish Netherlands, which included reopening Antwerp.

William II of Orange's death in 1650 led to the First Stadtholderless Period, with political control vested in the urban patricians or Regenten. This maximised the influence of the States of Holland and Amsterdam, the power base of Johan de Witt, Grand Pensionary from 1653 to 1672. He viewed his relationship with Louis XIV of France as crucial for preserving Dutch economic power, but also to protect him from his domestic Orangist opponents.

Although France and the Republic concluded an assistance treaty in 1662, the States of Holland refused to support a division of the Spanish Netherlands, convincing Louis his objectives could only be achieved by force. The Dutch received limited French support during the Second Anglo-Dutch War (1665-1667) but increasingly preferred a weak Spain as a neighbour to a strong France. (Note: An attitude described at the time as Gallus amicus, non-vicinus or "The Frenchman should be a friend, not a neighbour") Shortly after talks to end the Anglo-Dutch War began in May 1667, Louis launched the War of Devolution, rapidly occupying most of the Spanish Netherlands and Franche-Comté.

In July, the Treaty of Breda ended the Anglo-Dutch War, leading to talks between the Dutch and Charles II of England on a common diplomatic front against France. This was supported by Spain and Emperor Leopold, who was also concerned by French expansion. After his first suggestion of an Anglo-French alliance was rejected by Louis, Charles entered the 1668 Triple Alliance, between England, the Republic and Sweden. After the Alliance mediated between France and Spain, Louis relinquished many of his gains in the 1668 Treaty of Aix-la-Chapelle.

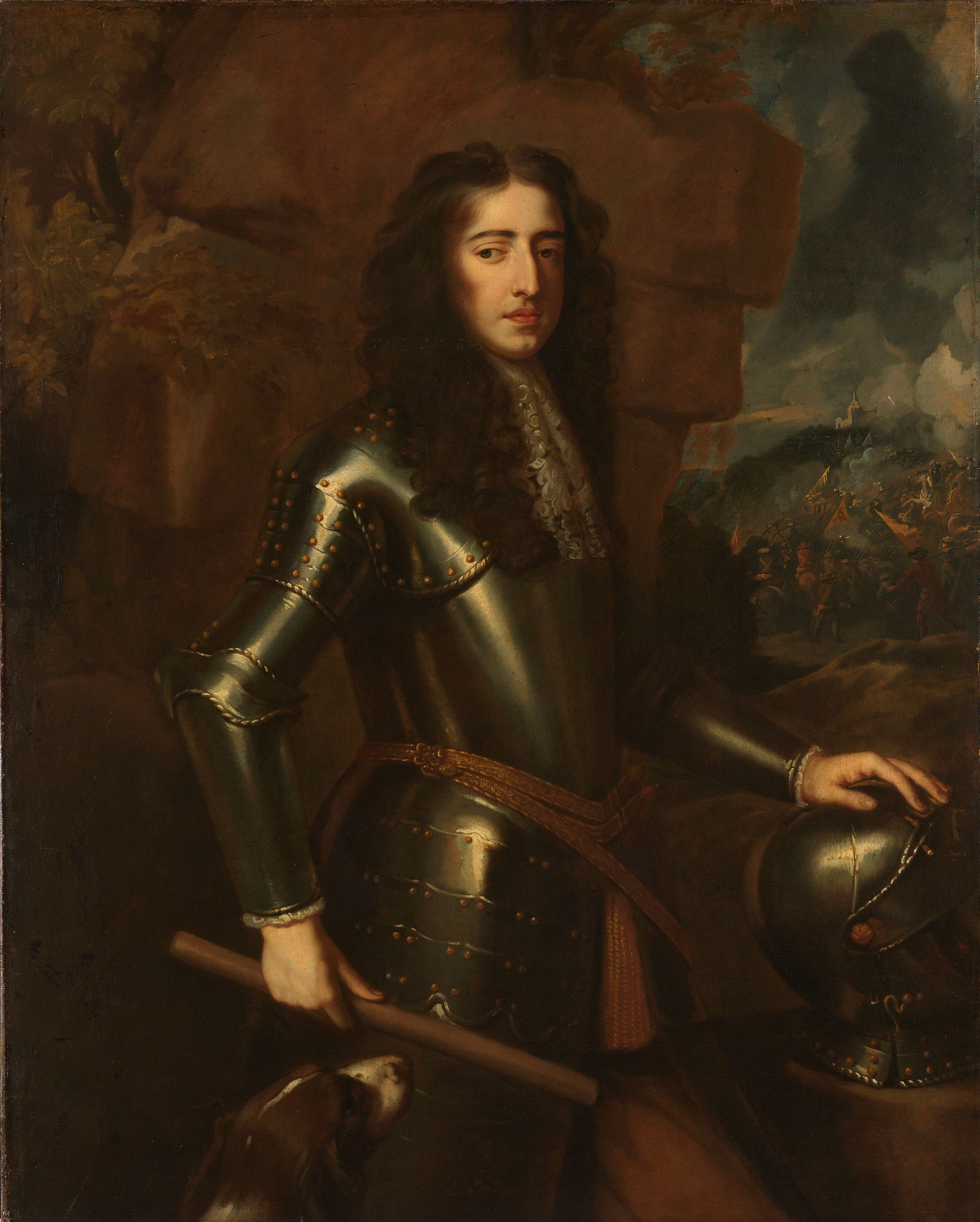
Prince William of Orange, appointed Captain-General in February 1672; political conflict between his supporters and de Witt impacted Dutch preparations

While Breda and Aix-la-Chapelle were seen as Dutch diplomatic triumphs, they also presented significant dangers; De Witt himself was well aware of these, but failed to convince his colleagues. Louis considered the January 1668 Partition Treaty with Leopold confirmation of his right to the Spanish Netherlands, a point reinforced by Aix-la-Chapelle, despite his concessions. He no longer saw the need to negotiate, and decided their acquisition was best achieved by first defeating the Republic.

The Dutch also over-estimated their own power; defeat at Lowestoft in 1665 exposed the shortcomings of their navy and the federal command system, while the successful Raid on the Medway was largely due to English financial weakness. In 1667, the Dutch States Navy was at the height of its power, an advantage rapidly eroded by English and French naval expansion. The Anglo-Dutch War was primarily fought at sea, masking the poor state of the Dutch army and forts, deliberately neglected since they were viewed as bolstering the power of the Prince of Orange.

In preparation for an attack on the Republic, Louis embarked on a series of diplomatic initiatives, the first being the 1670 Secret Treaty of Dover, an Anglo-French alliance against the Dutch. It contained secret clauses not revealed until 1771, including the payment to Charles of £230,000 per year for providing a British brigade of 6,000. Agreements with the Bishopric of Münster and Electorate of Cologne allowed French forces to bypass the Spanish Netherlands, by attacking via the Bishopric of Liège, then a dependency of Cologne (see Map). Preparations were completed in April 1672, when Charles XI of Sweden accepted French subsidies in return for invading areas of Pomerania claimed by Brandenburg-Prussia.

== Preparations ==
French armies of the period held significant advantages over their opponents; an undivided command, talented generals like Turenne, Condé and Luxembourg, as well as vastly superior logistics. Reforms introduced by Louvois, the Secretary of War, helped maintain large field armies that could be mobilised much quicker. This meant the French could mount offensives in early spring before their opponents were ready, seize their objectives, then assume a defensive posture. As in other wars of the period, the army's strength fluctuated throughout the conflict; starting with 180,000 in 1672, by 1678 it had an authorised strength of 219,250 infantry and 60,360 cavalry, of whom 116,370 served in garrisons.

The retention of border towns like Charleroi and Tournai in 1668 allowed Louvois to pre-position supply dumps, stretching from the French border to Neuss in the Rhineland. 120,000 men were allocated to attacks on the Republic, split into two main groups; one at Charleroi, under Turenne, the other near Sedan, commanded by Condé. After marching through the Bishopric of Liège, they would join near Maastricht, then occupy the Duchy of Cleves, a possession of Frederick William, Elector of Brandenburg. At the same time 30,000 mercenaries, paid by Münster and Cologne and led by Luxembourg, would attack from the east. One final element was a planned English landing in the Spanish Netherlands but this ceased to be a viable option as the Dutch retained control of the sea.

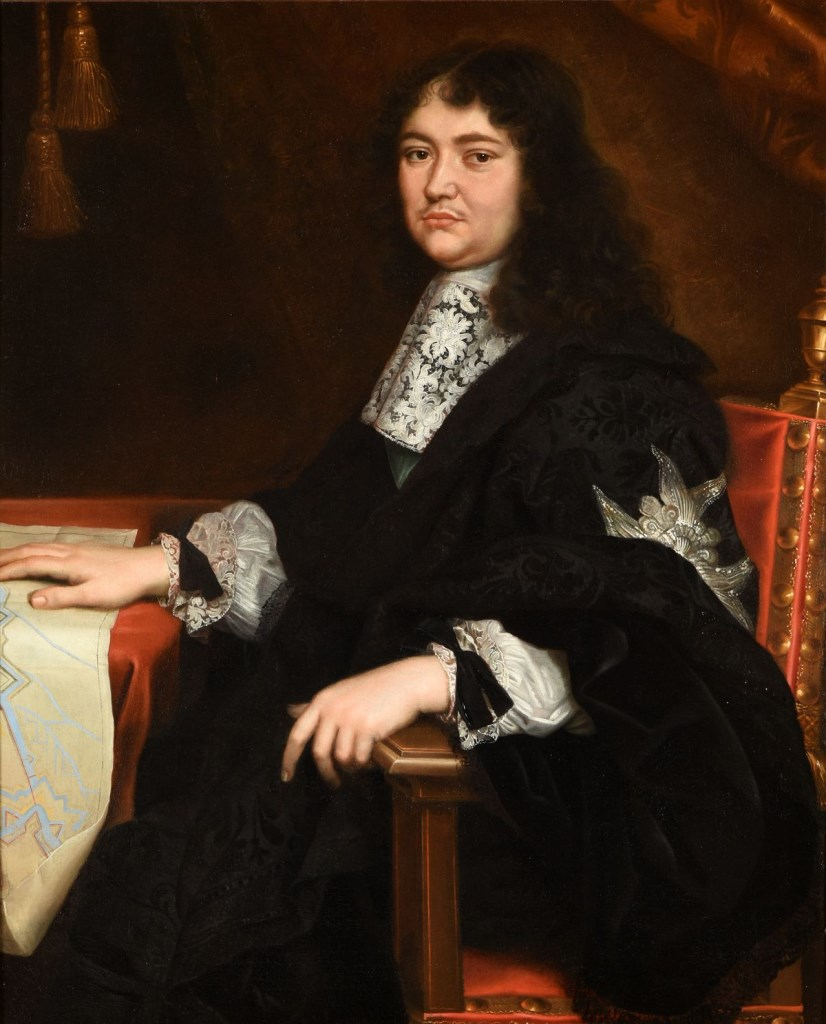
Louvois, French Secretary of War, whose reforms were crucial to French success

The French had demonstrated their new tactics when over-running the Duchy of Lorraine in mid 1670, while the Dutch were given accurate information on their plans as early as February 1671. These were confirmed by Condé in November and again in January 1672, Dutch regent de Groot describing him as "one of our best friends." However, the Dutch were poorly prepared for a campaign against France; available funds had mostly been invested in the fleet, at the expense of their land defences. Most of the Dutch States Army was based in the three southern fortresses of Breda, 's-Hertogenbosch and Maastricht; in November 1671, the Council of State reported these as being short of supplies and money, with many fortifications barely defendable. Most units were substantially below strength; on 12 June, one officer reported his official strength of eighteen companies had only enough men for four.

This was partly because with Prince William now of age, his Orangist supporters refused to approve additional military spending unless he was appointed Captain-General, a move opposed by de Witt. Aware of internal English opposition to the Anglo-French alliance, the Dutch relied on the provisions of the Triple Alliance requiring England and the Republic to support each other, if attacked by Spain or France. This assumption was shared by the Parliament of England, who approved funding for the fleet in early 1671 to fulfil its obligations under the alliance. The true danger only became obvious on 23 March, when acting under orders from Charles, the Royal Navy attacked a Dutch merchant convoy in the Channel; this followed a similar incident in 1664.

In February 1672, de Witt compromised by appointing William as Captain-General for a year. Budgets were approved and contracts issued to increase the army to over 80,000 but assembling these men would take months. Negotiations with Frederick William to reinforce Cleves with 30,000 men were delayed by his demands for Dutch-held fortresses on the Rhine, including Rheinberg and Wesel. By the time they reached agreement on 6 May, he was occupied with a French-backed Swedish invasion of Pomerania, and could not engage the French in 1672. The Maastricht garrison was increased to 11,000, in the hope they could delay the French long enough to strengthen the eastern border; the cities provided 12,000 men from their civil militia, with 70,000 peasants conscripted to build earthworks along the IJssel river. These were unfinished when France declared war on 6 April, followed by England on 7 April, using a manufactured diplomatic incident known as the 'Merlin' affair. Münster and Cologne entered the war on 18 May.

== French offensive: 1672 ==
=== France crosses the Rhine ===
The French offensive began on 4 May 1672 when a subsidiary force under Condé left Sedan and marched north along the right bank of the Meuse. Next day, Louis arrived in Charleroi to inspect the main army of 50,000 under Turenne, one of the most magnificent displays of military power in the seventeenth century. Accompanied by Louis, on 17 May Turenne met up with Condé at Visé, just south of Maastricht; supported by Condé, Louis wanted to besiege the fortress immediately but Turenne convinced him it would be folly to allow the Dutch time to reinforce other positions. Avoiding a direct assault on Maastricht, Turenne prevented it being reinforced by occupying outlying positions at Tongeren, Maaseik and Valkenburg.

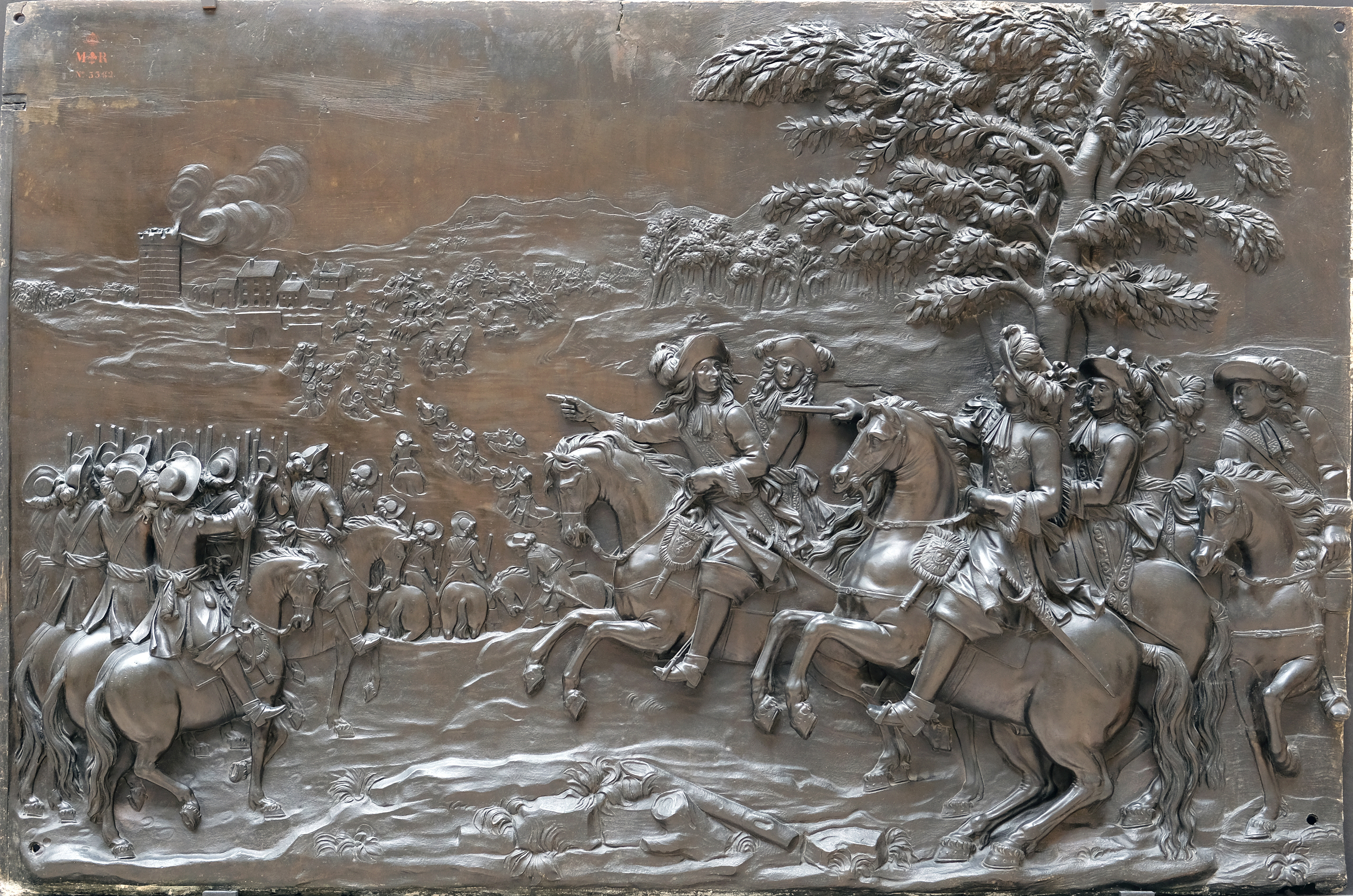
The crossing of the Rhine, Louvre.

Map of the Netherlands (Dutch Republic and Spanish) and surrounding areas during the French invasion and occupation of 1672

Leaving 10,000 men to cover Maastricht, the rest of the French army crossed back over the Meuse, then advanced along the Rhine, supported by troops from Münster and the Electorate of Cologne, led by Luxembourg. The Dutch garrisoned forts intended to defend the Rhine crossings were still severely undermanned and poorly equipped. By 5 June, the French had captured Rheinberg, Orsoy and Burick, with minimal resistance; Wesel, perhaps the most important fortress, surrendered when the townspeople threatened to butcher the commanders, followed by Rees on 9 June. Having secured their rear, the bulk of the French army began to cross the Rhine at Emmerich am Rhein; Grand Pensionary De Witt was deeply shocked by the news of the catastrophe and concluded "the fatherland is now lost".

Although the situation on land had become critical for the Dutch, events at sea were much more favourable. On 7 June, Dutch Lieutenant-Admiral Michiel de Ruyter attacked the Anglo-French fleet as it took on supplies at Southwold on the English coast. The French squadron under d'Estrées and English squadrons under the Duke of York failed to properly coordinate, which meant that the French ended up fighting a separate battle with Lieutenant-Admiral Adriaen Banckert. This led to mutual recriminations between the two allies. Although ship losses were roughly equal, the Battle of Solebay ensured the Dutch retained control of their coastal waters, secured their trade routes and ended hopes of an Anglo-French landing in Zeeland. Anger at the alleged lack of support from D'Estrées increased opposition to the war, and the English Parliament was reluctant to approve funds for essential repairs. For the rest of the year, this restricted English naval operations to a failed attack on the Dutch East India Company Return Fleet.

=== IJssel Line is outflanked ===
In early June, the Dutch headquarters at Arnhem prepared itself for a French onslaught on the IJssel Line. Only twenty thousand troops could be assembled to block a crossing and a dry spring meant that the river could be forded at many points. Nevertheless, there seemed to be no alternative but to make a last stand at the IJssel. However, should the enemy outflank this river by crossing the Lower Rhine into the Betuwe, the field army would fall back to the west to prevent being surrounded and quickly annihilated. The commander of Fort Schenkenschanz protecting the Lower Rhine abandoned his position. When he arrived at Arnhem with his troops, immediately a force of two thousand horse and foot under Field Marshal Paulus Wirtz was sent out to cover the Betuwe. At arrival they intercepted French cavalry crossing at a ford pointed out to them by a farmer. A bloody encounter fight followed but in this Battle of Tolhuis on 12 June, the Dutch cavalry was eventually overwhelmed by French reinforcements. Louis personally observed the battle from the Elterberg. Condé was shot through the wrist. In France, this battle was celebrated as a major victory and paintings of the Passage du Rhin have this crossing as their subject, not the earlier one at Emmerich.

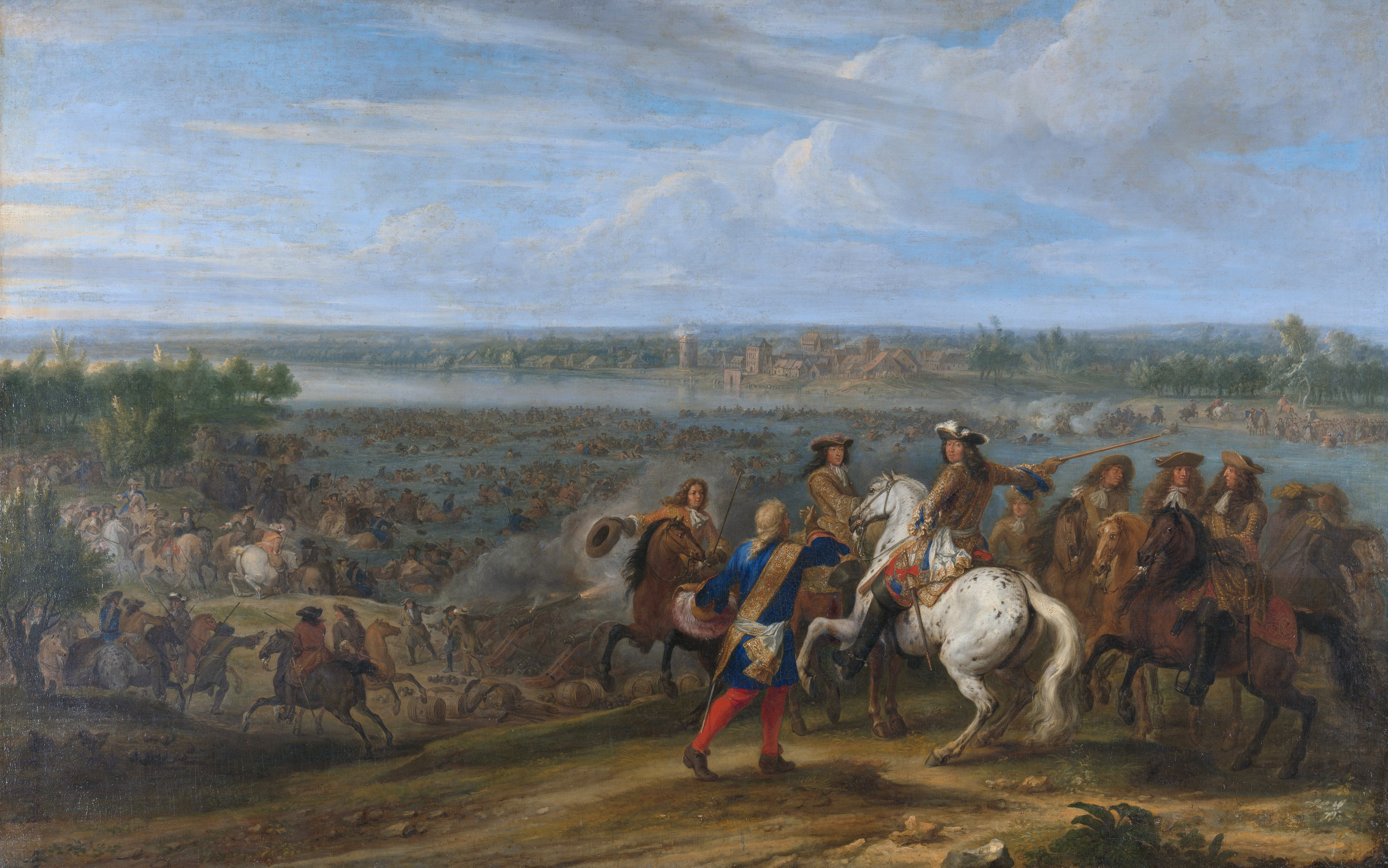
The Passage du Rhin

Captain-General William Henry now wanted the entire field army to fall back on Utrecht. However, in 1666 the provinces had regained full sovereignty of their forces. Overijssel and Guelders in June 1672 withdrew their troops from the confederated army. The French army made little effort to cut off the escape route of the Dutch field army. Turenne recrossed the Lower Rhine to attack Arnhem, while part of his army moved to the Waal towards Fort Knodsenburg at Nijmegen. Louis wanted to besiege Doesburg first, on the east side of the IJssel, taking it on 21 June. The king delayed the capture somewhat to allow his brother, Philippe I, Duke of Orléans, to take Zutphen some days earlier. On his right flank, the armies of Münster and Cologne, reinforced by a French corps under de Luxembourg, advanced to the north along the river, after having taken Grol on 10 June and Bredevoort on 18 June. The IJssel cities panicked. Deventer seceded from the Republic and again rejoined the Holy Roman Empire on 25 June. Then, the province of Overijssel surrendered as a whole to the bishop of Münster, Bernard von Galen, whose troops plundered towns on the west side of the IJssel, such as Hattem, Elburg and Harderwijk, on 21 June. Louis ordered Luxembourg to expel them again, as he wanted to make the duchy of Guelders a French possession. Annoyed, Von Galen announced to advance to the north of the Republic and invited de Luxembourg to follow him by wading through the IJssel, as no pontoon bridge was available. Exasperated, Luxembourg got permission from Louis to withhold his corps and the army of Cologne from the Münsterite forces.

From that point onwards, Von Galen would wage a largely separate campaign. He started to besiege Coevorden on 20 June. Von Galen, nicknamed "Bomb Berend", was an expert on artillery ammunition and had devised the first practical incendiary shell or carcass. With such fire shot he intimidated the garrison of Coevorden into a quick surrender on 1 July. He was advised by his subcommanders to subsequently plunder the hardly defended Friesland and use vessels captured there to isolate Groningen, the largest city in the north. Alternatively, he could take Delfzijl, allowing a landing by an English expeditionary force. But the bishop feared the Protestant British would make common cause with the Calvinist Groningers and expected that his siege mortars would force a fast capitulation, starting the Siege of Groningen on 21 July.

=== Peace negotiations ===
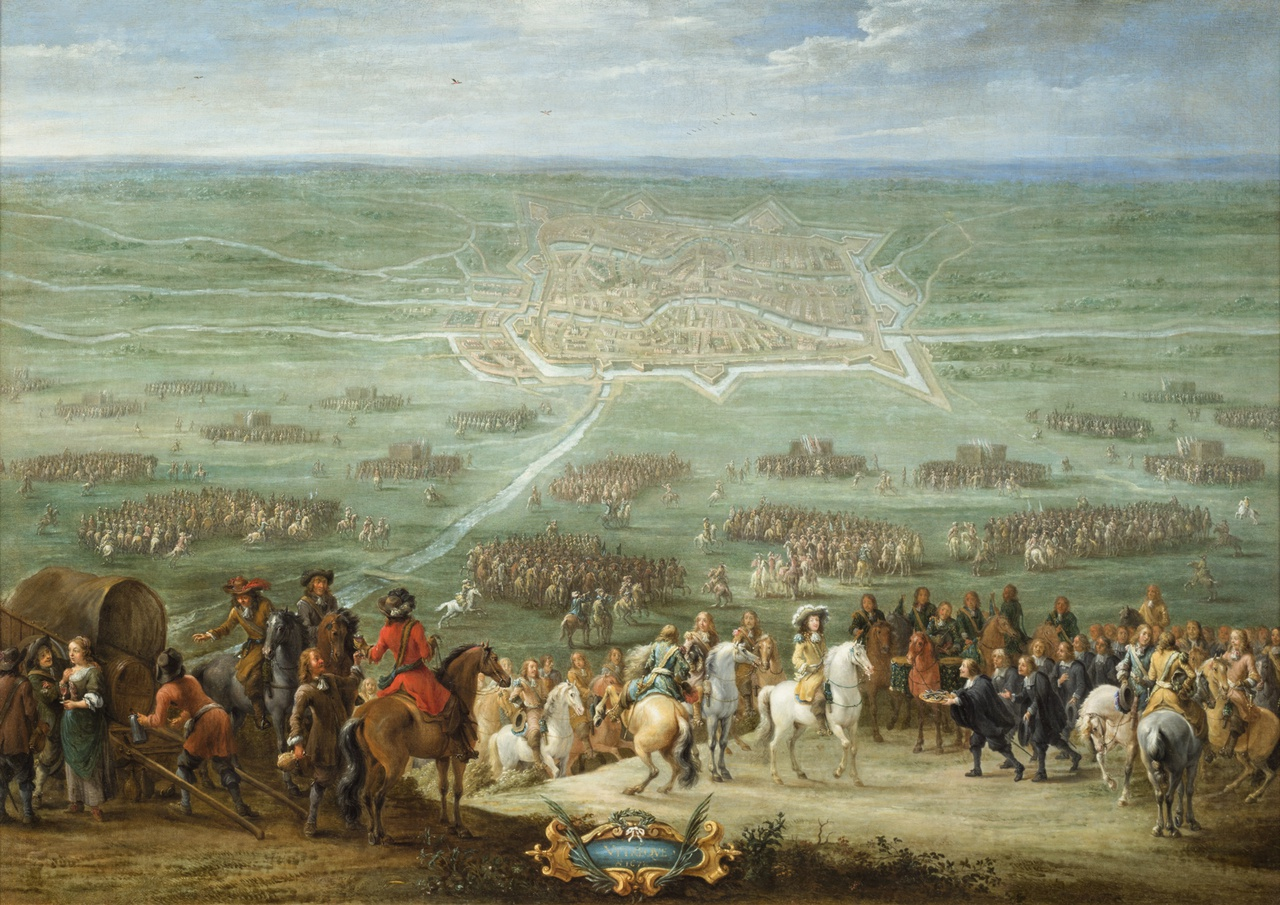
Lambert de Hondt (II): Louis XIV is offered the city keys of Utrecht, as its magistrates formally surrender on 30 June 1672

On 14 June, William arrived with the remnants of the field army, some eight thousand men, at Utrecht. The common citizens had taken over the city gates and refused him entrance. In talks with the official city council, William had to admit that he had no intention to defend the city but would retreat behind the Holland Water Line, a series of inundations protecting the core province of Holland. Eventually, the council of Utrecht delivered the keys of the gates to Henri Louis d'Aloigny (the Marquis de Rochefort), to avoid plundering. On 18 June, William withdrew his forces. The flooding was not ready yet, only having been ordered on 8 June, and the countryside of Holland was defenceless against the French. On 19 June, the French took the fortress of Naarden close to Amsterdam.

In a defeatist mood a divided States of Holland – Amsterdam was more pugnacious – sent a delegation to de Louvois in Zeist to ask for peace terms, headed by Pieter de Groot. The French king was offered the Generality Lands and ten million guilders. Compared to the eventual outcome of the war, these conditions were very favourable to France. It would have led to territorial gains in the Low Countries for France not equalled until 1810. The Generality Lands included the fortresses of Breda, 's-Hertogenbosch and Maastricht. Their possession would have greatly facilitated the conquest of the Spanish Netherlands, and the remaining Republic would have been little more than a French satellite state. De Louvois, rather bemused that the Estates had not capitulated but still considered some damage control possible, demanded far harsher terms.

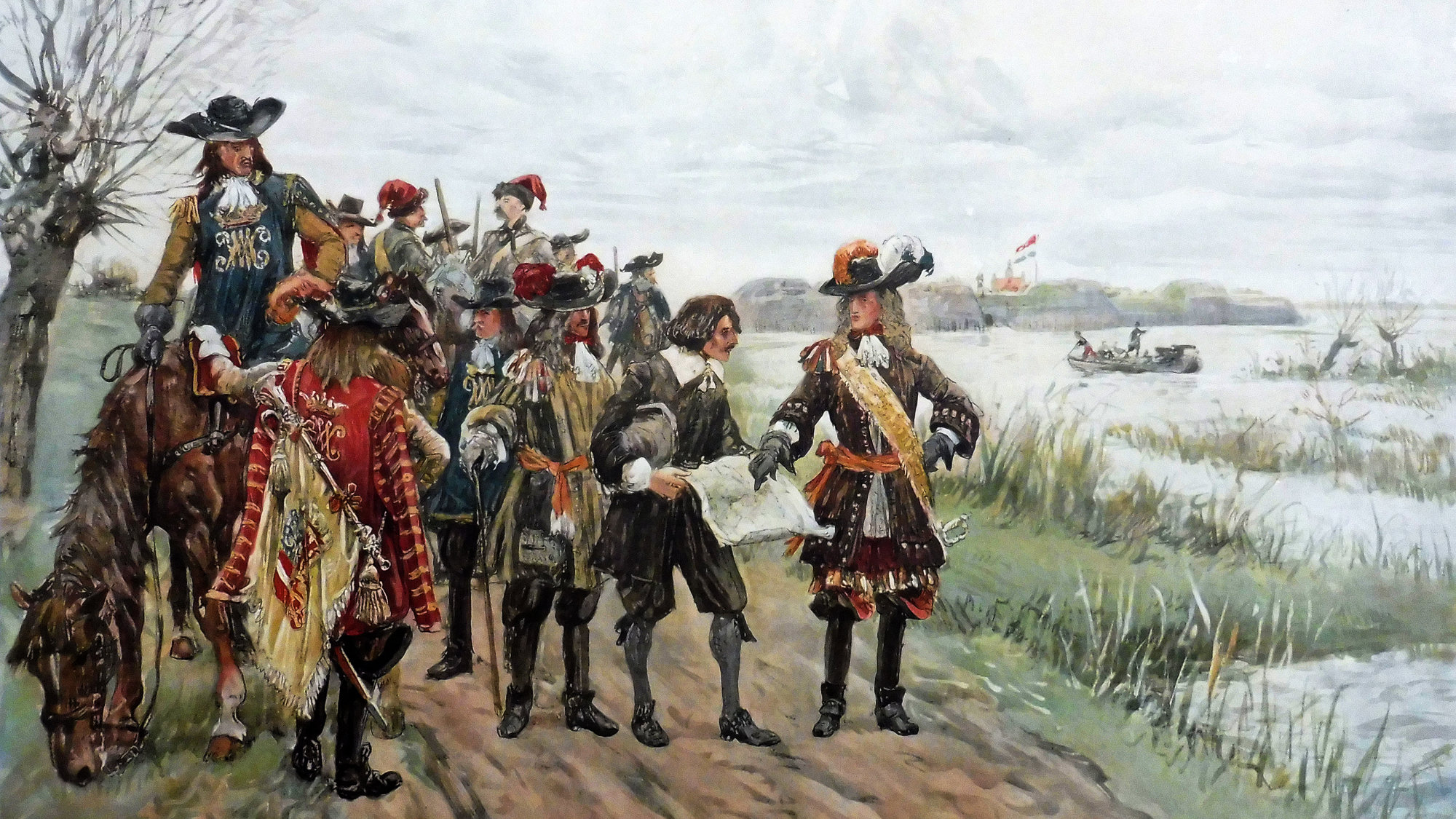
William of Orange inspects the Dutch Water Line

The Dutch were given the choice of surrendering their southern fortresses, permitting religious freedom for Catholics and a payment of six million guilders, or France and Münster retaining their existing gains – thus the loss of Overijssel, Guelders and Utrecht – and a single payment of sixteen million livres. Louis knew perfectly well that the delegation did not have the mandate to agree such terms and would have to return for new instructions. However, he also did not continue his advance to the west.

Several explanations have been given for this policy. The French were rather overwhelmed by their success. They had within a month captured three dozen fortresses. This strained their organisational and logistical capacities. All these strongholds had to be garrisoned and supplied. An intrusion into Holland proper seemed meaningless to them, unless Amsterdam could be besieged. This city would be a very problematic target. It had a population of 200,000 and could raise a large civil militia, reinforced by thousands of sailors. As the city had recently expanded, its fortifications were the best maintained in the Republic. Their normal armament of three hundred pieces was being enlarged by the militia hauling the reserve ordnance of the Admiralty of Amsterdam upon the ramparts which began to bristle with thousands of cannon. The low-lying surrounding terrain, below sea level, was easily flooded, making a traditional attack via trenches impractical. The battle fleet could support the fortifications from the IJ and Zuyderzee with gun fire, meanwhile ensuring a constant resupply of the food and ammunition stocks. A deeper problem was that Amsterdam was the world's main financial centre. The promissory notes with which many of the French military and the contractors had been paid, were covered by the gold and silver reserves of the Amsterdam banks. Their loss would mean the collapse of Europe's financial system and the personal bankruptcy of large segments of the French elite.

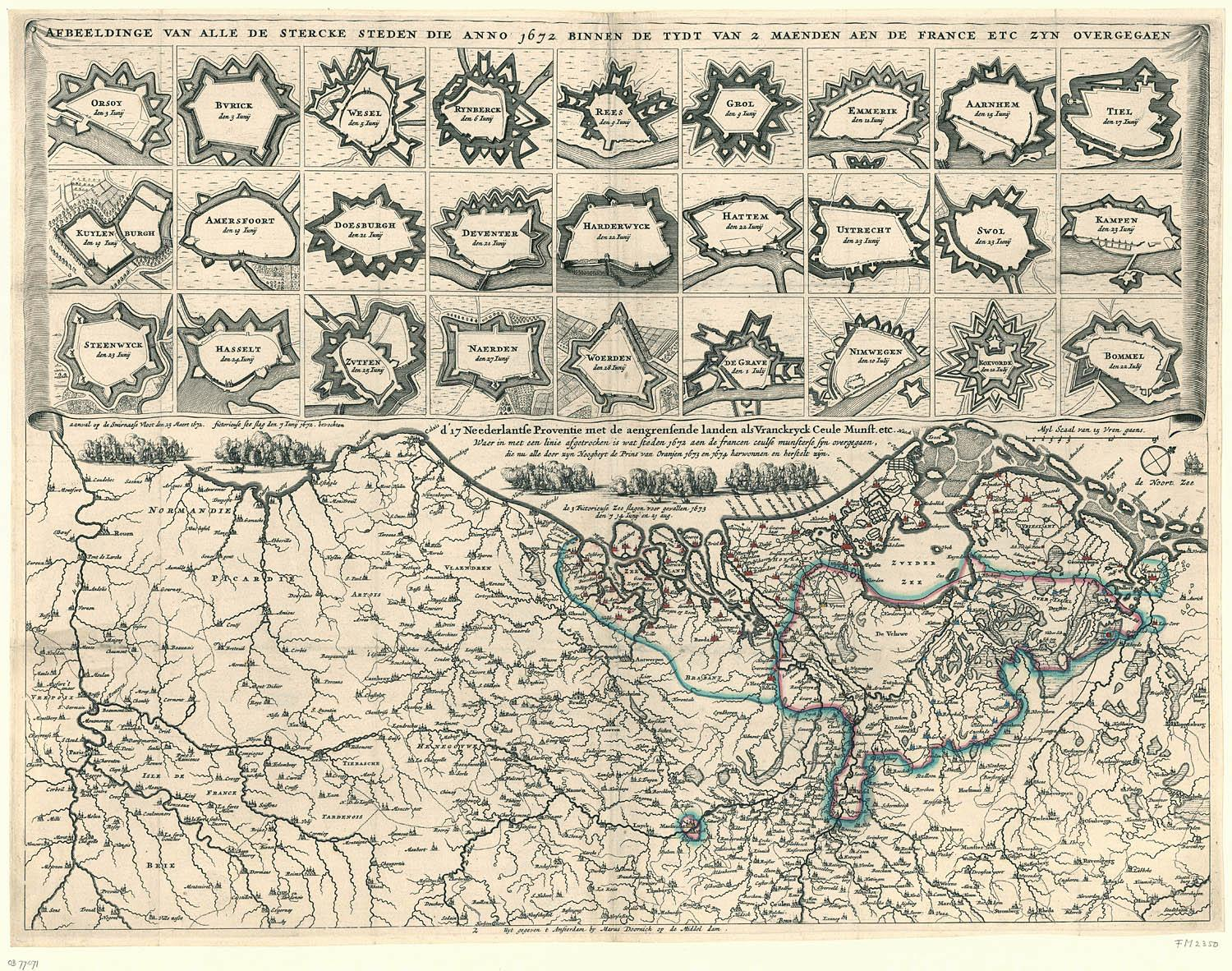
The three dozen fortresses captured by the invading forces

Relations with England were also delicate. Louis had promised Charles to make William Henry the Sovereign Prince of a Holland rump state and puppet state. He very much preferred that it would be France pulling the strings but there was a distinct possibility that the uncle of the prince would be in control. Louis had not mentioned William in his peace conditions. The very patricians that the French king desired to punish were traditionally pro-French and his natural allies against the pro-English Orangists. He wanted to simply annex Holland and hoped that fear of the Orangists would cause the regenten to surrender the province to him. Of course, the opposite might happen too: that a French advance would lead to the Orangists taking power and capitulating to England. The province of Zealand had already decided to rather make Charles their lord than be subjugated by the French. Only fear of the military power of De Ruyter's fleet had kept them from surrendering outright to the English. De Ruyter would not tolerate any talk of capitulation and intended, if necessary, to take the fleet overseas to continue the fight. Louis feared the English wanted to claim Staats-Vlaanderen which he saw as French territory because the County of Flanders was a fief of the French crown. In secret he arranged an informal warband of six thousand under Claude Antoine de Dreux to quickly cross the officially neutral Spanish Flanders and execute a surprise assault on the Dutch fortress of Aardenburg, on 25–26 June. The attempt was a total failure, the small garrison killing hundreds of attackers and taking prisoner over six hundred Frenchmen who had become pinned down in a ravelin.

Louis also allowed his honour to take precedence over the raison d'état. The harsh peace conditions upon which he insisted were meant to humiliate the Dutch. He demanded an annual embassy to the French court asking pardon for their perfidy and presenting a plaquette extolling the magnanimity of the French king. For Louis, a campaign was not complete without some major siege to enhance his personal glory. The quick surrender of so many cities had been somewhat disappointing in this respect. Maastricht having escaped him for the time being, he turned his attention on an even more prestigious object: 's-Hertogenbosch, which was considered "inexpugnable". The city was not only a formidable fortress in itself, it was surrounded by a rare fortification belt. Normally its marshy surroundings would make a siege impossible but its presently weak garrison seemed to offer some possibility of success. After Nijmegen had been taken on 9 July, Turenne captured near 's-Hertogenbosch Fort Crèvecœur, which controlled the sluice outlets of the area, halting further inundations. The main French force, thus removed from the Holland war theatre, camped around Boxtel and Louis took residence in Heeswijk Castle.

=== Orangists take power ===
The news that the French had penetrated into the heart of the Republic led to a general panic in the cities of the province of Holland. Blaming the States regime for the Dutch collapse, their populations rioted. Members of the city councils were by force replaced by Orangist partisans or in fear of reprisals declared for the cause of the Prince of Orange. Pamphlets accused the regenten of having betrayed the Republic to Louis and De Ruyter of wanting to deliver the fleet to the French. When the French peace terms became known on 1 July, they caused outrage.

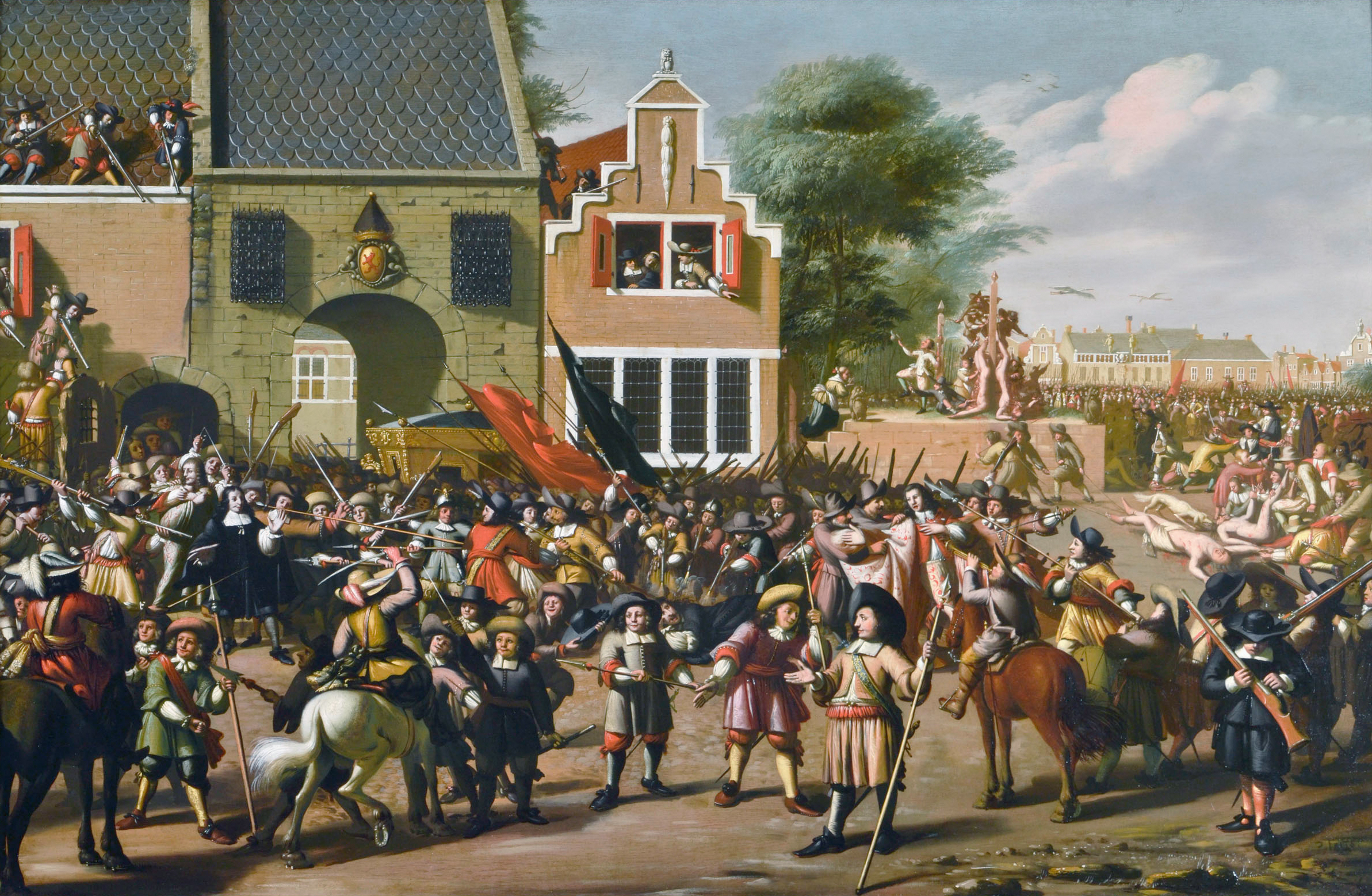
The murder of the De Witts

The result was to bolster Dutch resistance. On 2 July, William was appointed stadtholder of Zealand and on 4 July of Holland. The new stadtholder William III of Orange was given a general mandate to negotiate. Meanwhile, the polders of the Holland Water Line had slowly filled, forming an obstacle to a possible French advance. Charles thought that William's rise to power allowed to quickly obtain a peace favourable to England. He sent two of his ministers to Holland. They were received with jubilation by the population, who assumed they came to save them from the French. Arriving at the Dutch army camp in Nieuwerbrug, they proposed to install William as monarch of a Principality of Holland. In return he should pay ten million guilders as "indemnities" and formalise a permanent military English occupation of the ports of Brill, Sluys and Flushing. England would respect the French and Münsterite conquests. To their surprise, William flatly refused. He indicated that he might be more pliable if they managed to moderate the French peace terms. They then travelled to Heeswijk Castle, but the Accord of Heeswijk they agreed there was even harsher, England and France promising never to conclude a separate peace. France demanded the areas of Brabant, Limburg and Guelders. Charles tried to right matters by writing a very moderate letter to William, claiming that the only obstacle to peace was the influence of De Witt. William made counteroffers unacceptable to Charles but also on 15 August published the letter to incite the population. On 20 August, Johan and Cornelis de Witt were lynched by an Orangist civil militia, leaving William in control.

Observing that the water around 's-Hertogenbosch showed little sign of receding, Louis became impatient and lifted the siege on 26 July. Leaving his main force of 40,000 behind, he took 18,000 men with him, and marched to Paris within a week, straight through the Spanish Netherlands. He freed 12,000 Dutch prisoners of war for a small ransom, to avoid having to pay for their maintenance, allowing the majority to rejoin the Dutch States Army, which by August contained 57,000 men.

=== War of attrition ===
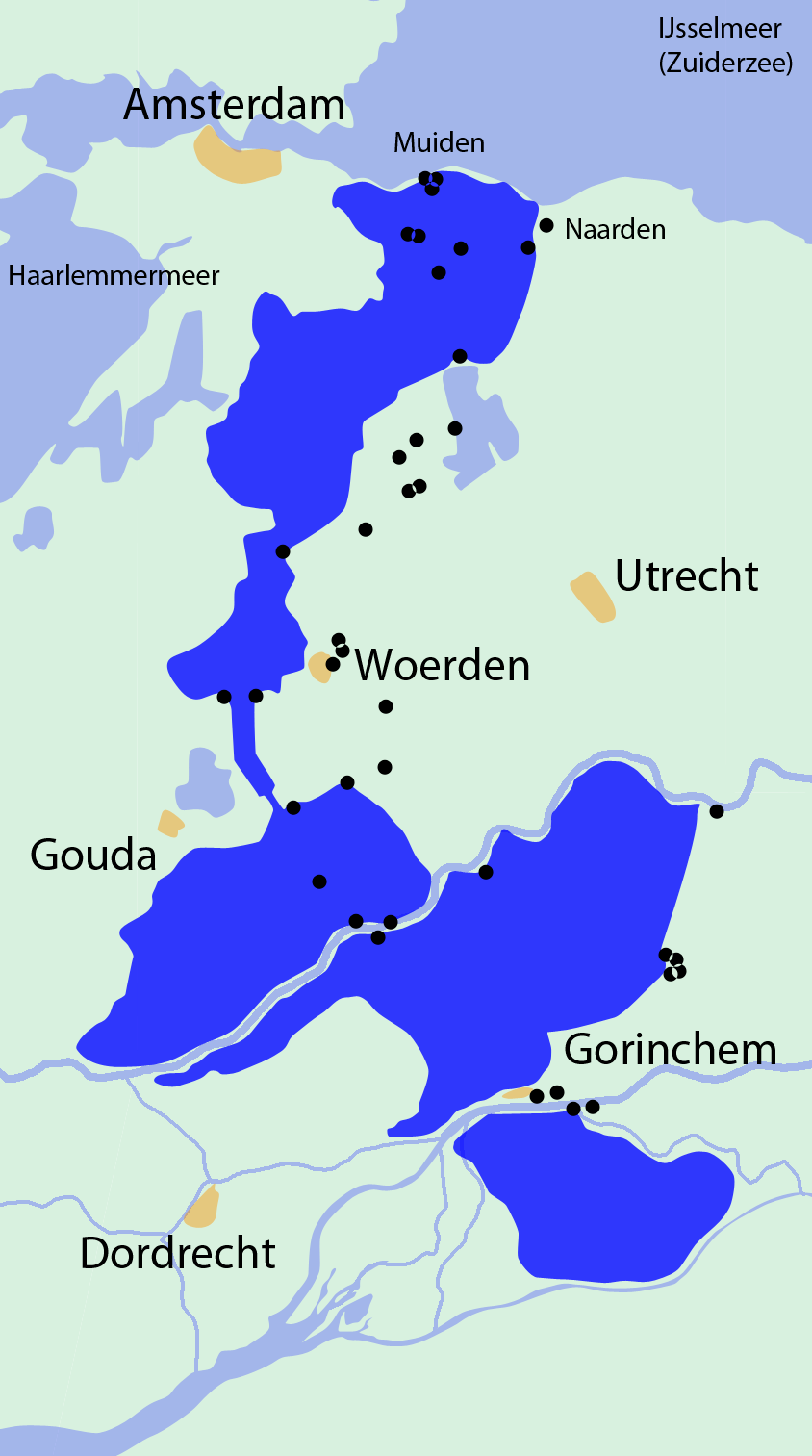
The Holland Water Line

In June, the Dutch seemed defeated. The Amsterdam stock market collapsed and their international credit evaporated. Frederick William, the Elector of Brandenburg, in these circumstances hardly dared to threaten the eastern borders of Münster. A single loyal ally remained: the Spanish Netherlands. They well understood that if the Dutch capitulated, they too would be lost. Although officially neutral, and forced to allow the French to transgress their territory with impunity, they openly reinforced the Dutch with thousands of troops.

Concern at French gains brought the support of Brandenburg-Prussia, Emperor Leopold and Charles II of Spain. Instead of a rapid victory, Louis was forced into a war of attrition around the French frontiers; in August, Turenne ended his offensive against the Dutch and proceeded to Germany with 25,000 infantry and 18,000 cavalry. Frederick William and Leopold combined their forces of around 25,000 under the Imperial general Raimondo Montecuccoli; he crossed the Rhine at Koblenz in January 1673 but Turenne forced him to retreat into northern Germany.

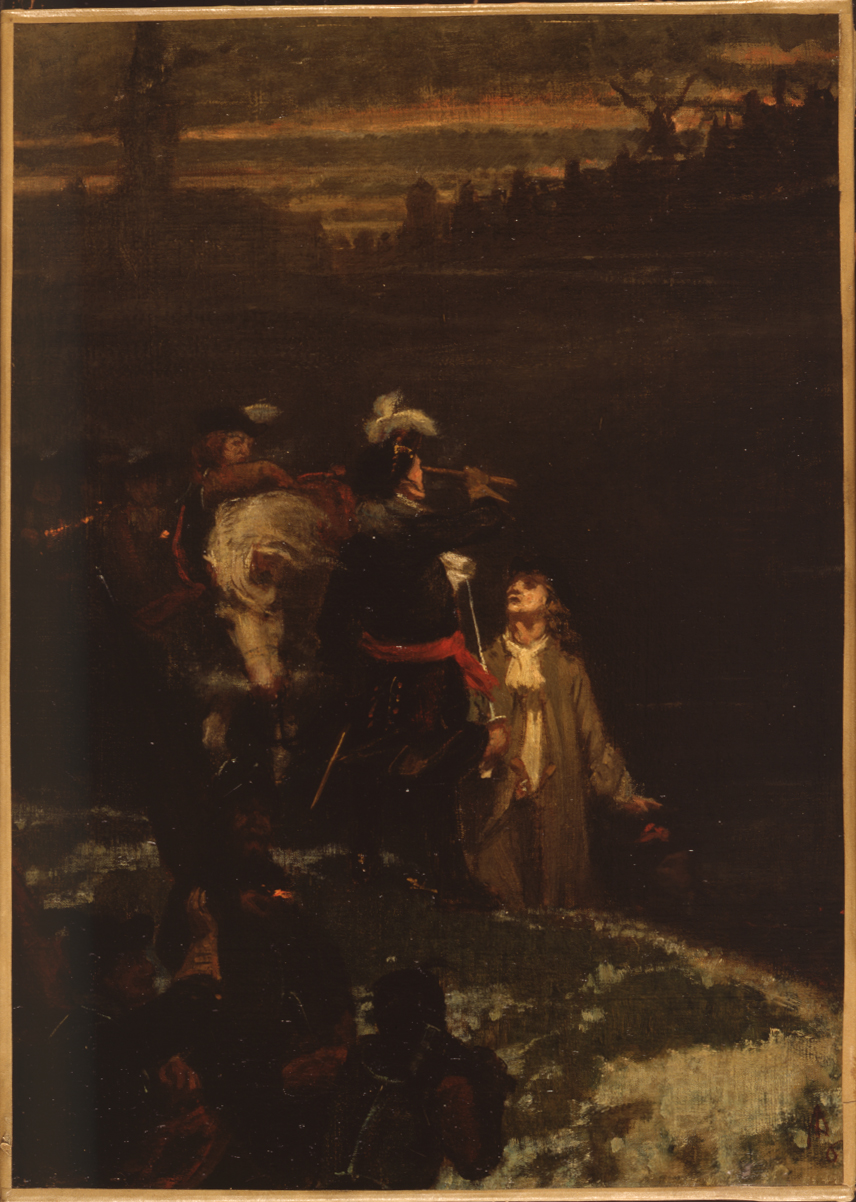
The surprise attack on Coevorden and its recapture by the Dutch, by Jacob de Vos

The faltering offensive caused financial problems for the anti-Dutch allies, especially England. Münster was in an even worse condition; on 27 August it had to abandon the siege of Groningen. Whereas the Dutch had managed to supply the city through waterways at its northern edge, Von Galen's troops were starving and had largely deserted. Largely due to an effective guerrilla campaign by troops from Friesland under Hans Willem van Aylva against their supply lines. Also, his siege mortars had lost the artillery duel with the fortress cannon, gradually having been destroyed. Before the end of 1672, the Dutch under Carl von Rabenhaupt retook Coevorden and liberated the province of Drenthe, leaving the Allies in possession of only three of the ten—the territories of Drenthe, Staats-Brabant, and Staats-Overmaas were also part of the republic—Dutch provincial areas. The supply lines of the French army were dangerously overextended. In the autumn of 1672, William tried to cut them off, crossing the Spanish Netherlands via Maastricht in forced marches to attack Charleroi, the starting point of the supply route through Liège, though he had to abandon the siege quickly.

The absence of the Dutch field army offered opportunities for the French to renew their offensive. On 27 December, after a severe frost, Luxembourg began to cross the ice of the Water Line with eight thousand men, hoping to sack The Hague. A sudden thaw cut his force in half and he narrowly escaped to his own lines with the remainder, on his way back massacring the civilian population of Bodegraven and Zwammerdam. This increased the hatred against Luxembourg. The province of Utrecht was one of the richest regions of Europe and intendant Louis Robert had extorted large sums from its wealthy inhabitants. The French applied the not-unusual method of mettre à contribution: unless noble refugees or Amsterdam merchants made regular payments, their luxury mansions would be burnt down. This made the general the favourite subject of Dutch anti-French propaganda. Special books were published highlighting the outrages he committed, illustrated by Romeyn de Hooghe. The most common Dutch school book, the Mirror of Youth, that had been dedicated to Spanish misdeeds, was now rewritten to reflect French atrocities.

== 1673 ==
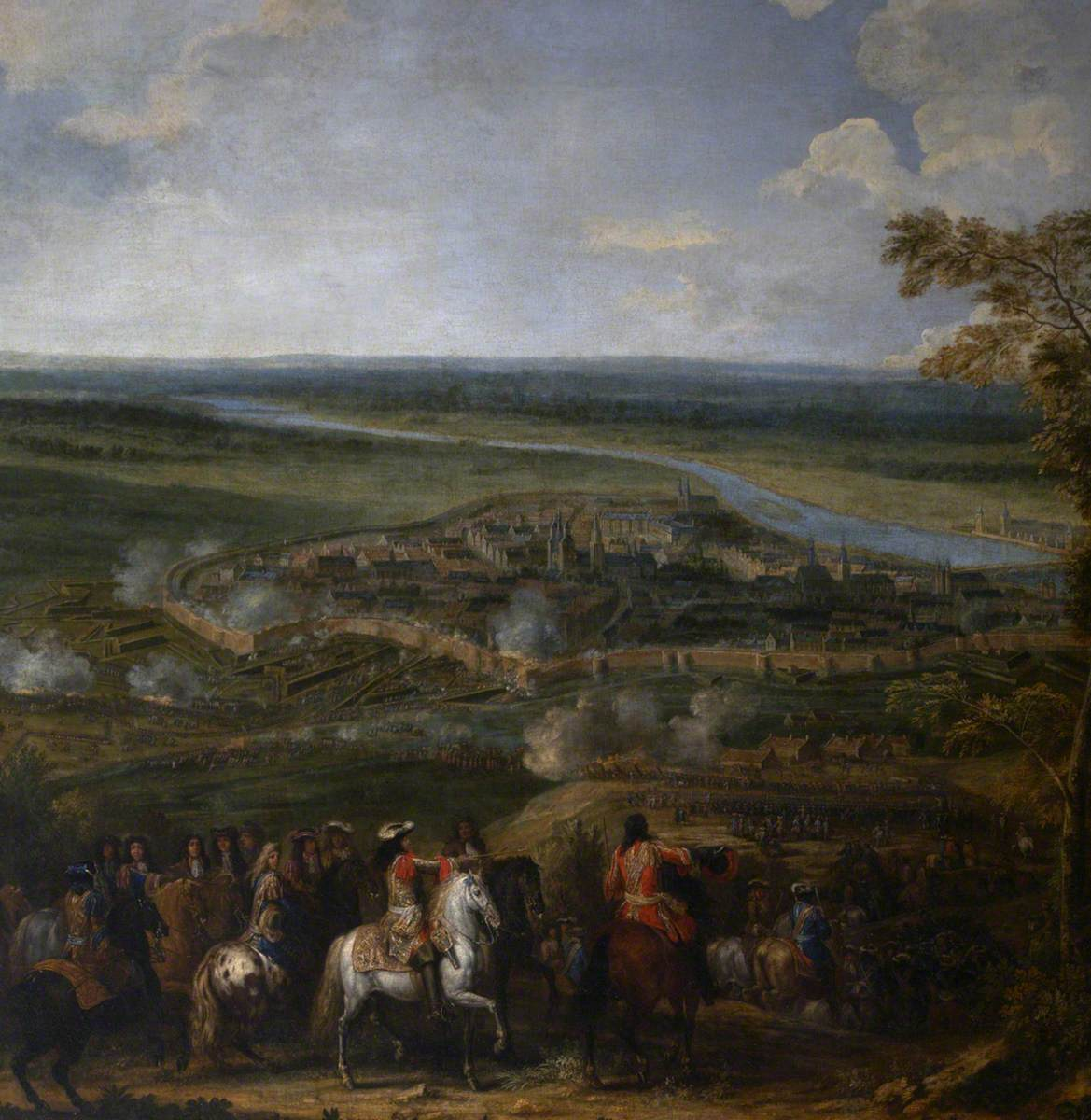
Louis XIV at Maastricht, 1673

Until the advent of railways in the 19th century, goods and supplies were largely transported by water, making rivers such as the Lys, Sambre and Meuse vital for trade and military operations. The primary French objective in 1673 was the capture of Maastricht, which controlled a key access point on the Meuse; the city surrendered on 30 June. In June 1673, the French occupation of Kleve and lack of money temporarily drove Brandenburg-Prussia out of the war in the Peace of Vossem.

However, on 30 August 1673 at The Hague, representatives of the Dutch Republic, Spain and the Holy Roman Empire, supported by other German states, concluded the anti-French alliance, joined by Charles IV of Lorraine in October, thus forming the Quadruple Alliance. In September, the resolute defense by John Maurice of Nassau-Siegen and Aylva in the north of the Dutch Republic had now finally forced Von Galen to withdraw, while William crossed the Dutch Waterline and recaptured Naarden. In November, a 30,000-strong Dutch-Spanish army, under William's command, marched into the lands of the Bishops of Münster and Cologne. The Dutch troops took revenge and carried out many atrocities. Together with 35,000 Imperial troops, they then captured Bonn, an important magazine in the long logistical lines between France and the Dutch Republic. The French position in the Netherlands became untenable and Louis was forced to evacuate French troops from the Dutch Republic. This deeply shocked Louis and he retreated to Saint Germain where no one, except a few intimates, were allowed to disturb him. The next year only Grave and Maastricht remained in French hands, while the war expanded into the Rhineland and Spain. Münster was forced to sign a peace treaty with the Dutch Republic in April 1674 and Cologne followed in May.

In England, the alliance with Catholic France had been unpopular from the start and although the real terms of the Treaty of Dover remained secret, many suspected them. The Cabal ministry that managed government for Charles had gambled on a short war but when this proved not to be the case, opinion quickly turned against it, while the French were also accused of abandoning the English at Solebay.

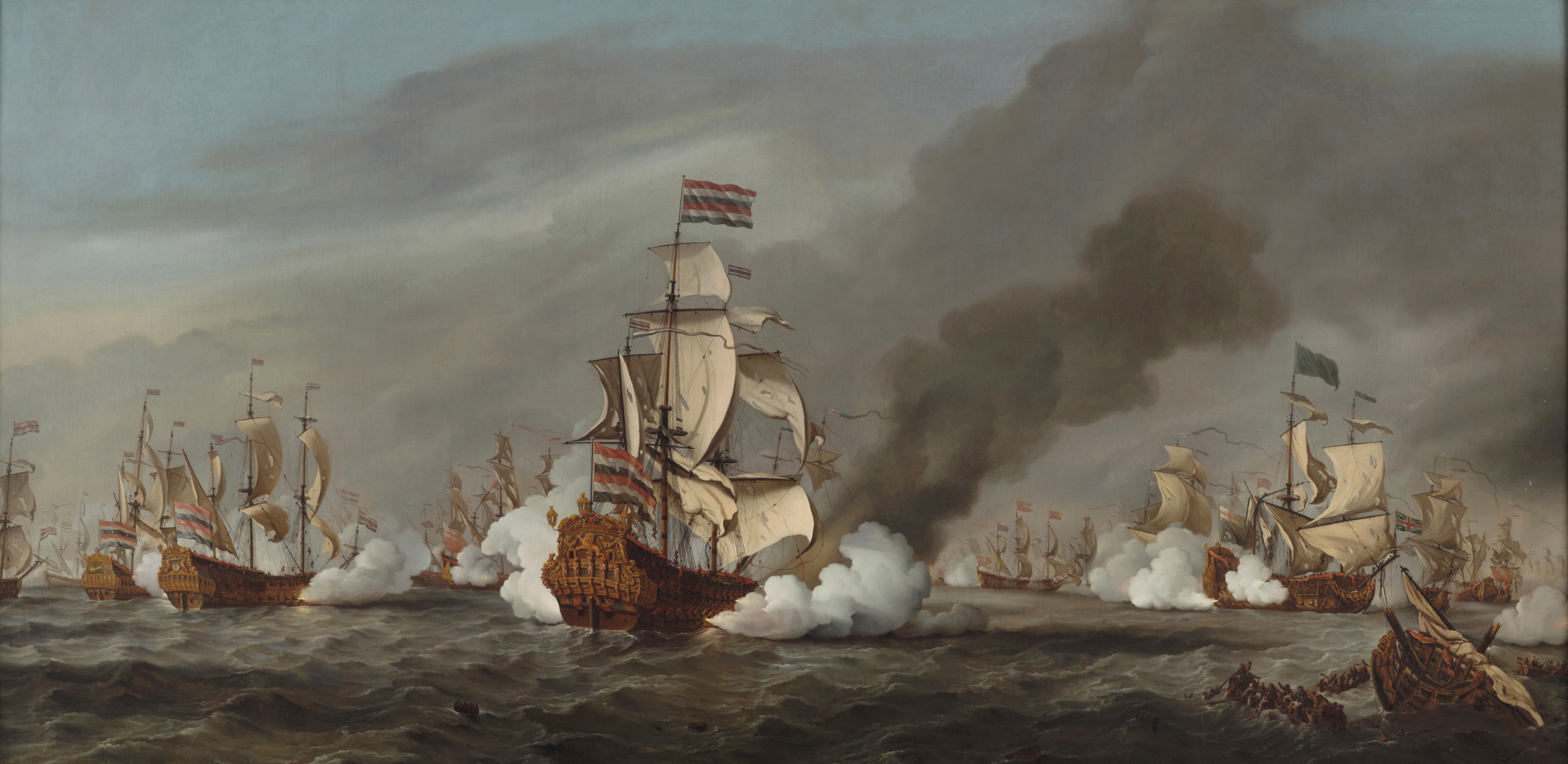
The Dutch victory over an Anglo-French fleet at the Battle of Texel in August 1673 ensured their survival.

Opposition to the alliance with France further increased when Charles' heir, his Catholic brother, James, was given permission to marry Mary of Modena, also a devout Catholic. In February 1673, Parliament refused to continue funding the war unless Charles withdrew a proposed Declaration of Indulgence and accepted a Test Act barring Catholics from public office. That summer De Ruyter again defeated the Anglo-French fleets, now under Prince Rupert, at the two battles of Schooneveld and at the Battle of Texel, while a Dutch fleet in the Americas recaptured New Amsterdam from the English. Pressure to end the war mounted in England and Charles made peace in the Treaty of Westminster of February 1674.

This combination of events led Louis to pursue a "policy of exhaustion that emphasised sieges and the gathering of war taxes, raids, and blockades over full-scale battles". In support of this strategy, Swedish forces in Swedish Pomerania attacked Brandenburg-Prussia in December 1674 after Louis threatened to withhold their subsidies. It resulted in the 1675–1679 Scanian War and the Swedish-Brandenburg War, whereby the Swedes tied up the armies of Brandenburg, Denmark and some minor German principalities.

Meanwhile, the French and English East India Companies had been unable to seriously undermine the strong position of the Dutch East India Company (VOC) in both the intercontinental route and in intra-Asian trades. The VOC secured its position in Asia by defeating the French garrison in Trincomalee and the English in the Battle of Masulipatnam, and besieged another French force in São Tomé, which fell in 1674.

== War expands: 1674–1675 ==
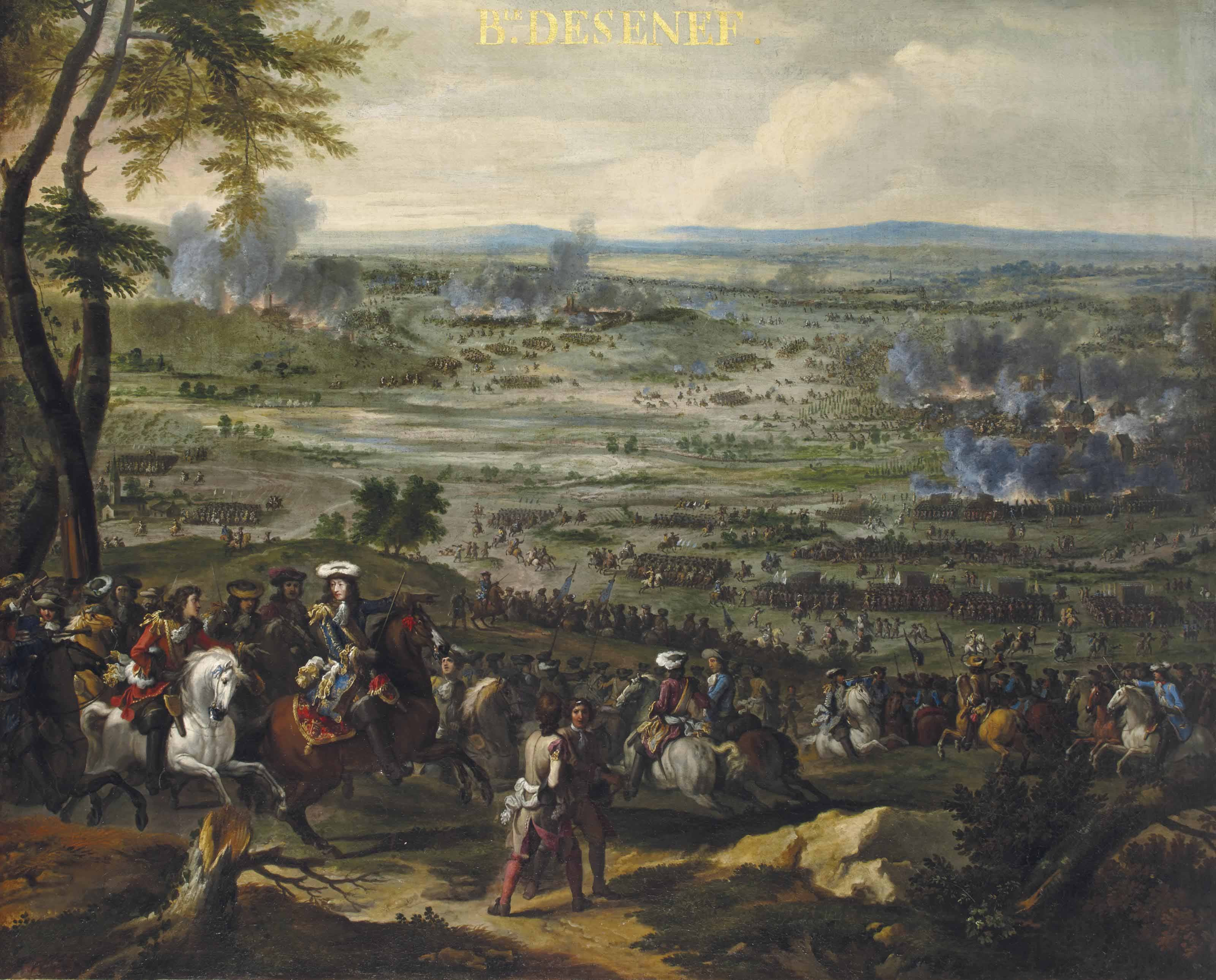
The Battle of Seneffe, 1674; a bloody but inconclusive battle

In broad terms, French strategy now focused on retaking Spanish possessions gained in 1667–1668 but returned at Aix-La-Chapelle, while preventing Imperialist advances in the Rhineland. They also supported minor campaigns in Roussillon and Sicily that absorbed Spanish and Dutch naval resources.

=== Flanders and the Franche-Comté ===
In the spring of 1674, the French invaded the region of Franche-Comté within the Holy Roman Empire, and occupied the Free County of Burgundy, held by the Spanish Habsburgs, also capturing the Free City of Besançon. They overran the entire province in less than six weeks. French troops then reinforced Condé's army in the Spanish Netherlands, who were outnumbered by the main Allied field army. William invaded French Flanders, hoping to recapture the Spanish possession of Charleroi and take Oudenarde, but was halted by Condé at the Battle of Seneffe. While both sides claimed victory, the appalling casualties confirmed Louis' preference for positional warfare, ushering in a period where siege and manoeuvre dominated military tactics.

One of the biggest obstacles to Allied success in Flanders was their diverging objectives; the Imperials wanted to prevent reinforcements reaching Turenne in the Rhineland while the Spanish aimed at recovering losses in the Spanish Netherlands. The Dutch were further split by internal disputes; the powerful Amsterdam mercantile body were anxious to end an expensive war once their commercial interests were secured, while William saw France as a long-term threat that had to be defeated. This conflict increased once ending the war became a distinct possibility with the recapture of Grave in October 1674, leaving only Maastricht.

=== Rhineland ===
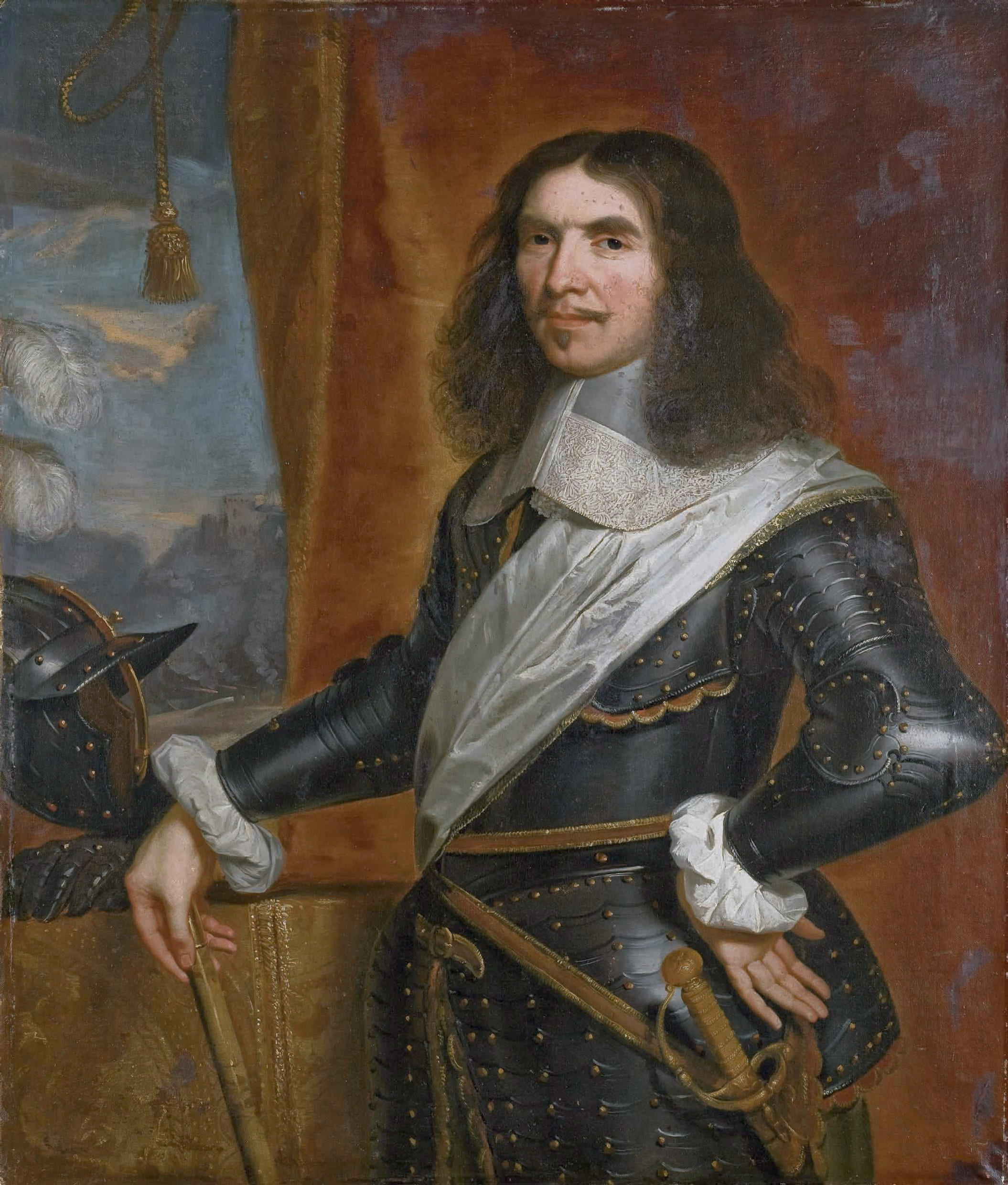
Turenne, killed at Salzbach in 1675; the Rhineland campaign of 1674–1675 is often viewed as his greatest achievement

During the winter of 1673–1674, Turenne based his troops in Alsace and the Palatinate; despite England's withdrawal from the war in February, his army of less than 8,000 retained a number of English regiments, as Charles II encouraged members to continue serving in order to keep his French subsidies. Monmouth and Churchill were among those who did so, while others enrolled in the Dutch Scots Brigade, including John Graham, later Viscount Dundee.

The 1674 campaign began when Turenne crossed the Rhine in June with 7,000 men, hoping to attack Charles of Lorraine before he could combine with forces under Alexander von Bournonville. At Sinsheim, the French routed a separate Imperial army led by Aeneas de Caprara but the delay allowed Bournonville to link up with Charles at Heidelberg; after receiving reinforcements, Turenne began crossing the Neckar river, forcing the Imperial troops to retreat.

Bournonville marched south to the Imperial city of Strasbourg, giving him a base for an attack on Alsace but delayed while he awaited the arrival of 20,000 troops under Frederick William. To prevent this, Turenne made a night march that enabled him to surprise the Imperial army and fought them to a standstill at Entzheim on 4 October. As was then accepted practice, Bournonville halted operations until spring but in his Winter Campaign 1674/1675, Turenne inflicted a series of defeats culminating in Turckkeim on 5 January, which secured Alsace and prevented an Imperial invasion. This campaign is often considered to be Turenne's masterpiece.

Command of Imperial operations in the Rhineland passed to Montecuccoli, the only Allied general considered equal to Turenne. He crossed the Rhine at Philippsburg with 25,000 men, hoping to draw the French north, then double back, but Turenne was not fooled, and instead blocked the river near Strasbourg to prevent Montecuccoli being resupplied. By mid-July, both armies were running out of food and Turenne tried to bring the retreating Imperial army to battle. At Salzbach on 27 July, he was killed by a stray cannonball while reconnoitering the enemy's positions. Demoralised by his death, the French withdrew after some inconclusive skirmishing, and fell back to Alsace. They were pursued by Montecuccoli, who crossed the Rhine at Strasbourg and besieged Hagenau, while another Imperial army defeated Créquy at Konzer Brücke and recaptured Trier. Condé was despatched from Flanders to take command and forced Montecuccoli to withdraw across the Rhine; however, ill-health forced him to retire in December and he was replaced by Créquy.

=== Spain and Sicily ===
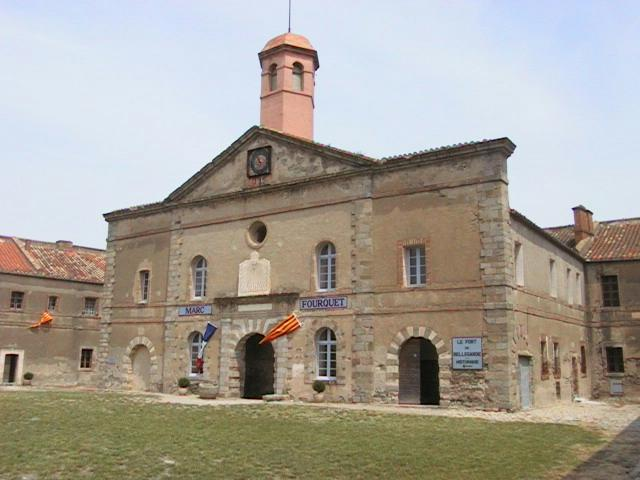
Fort Bellegarde

Activity on this front was largely limited to skirmishing in Roussillon between a French army under Frederick von Schomberg and Spanish forces led by the Duque de San Germán. The Spanish won a minor victory at Maureillas in June 1674 and captured Fort Bellegarde, ceded to France in 1659 and retaken by Schomberg in 1675.

In Sicily, the French supported a successful revolt by the city of Messina against its Spanish overlords in 1674, obliging San Germán to transfer some of his troops. A French naval force under Jean-Baptiste de Valbelle managed to resupply the city in early 1675 and establish local naval supremacy.

=== North Germany and Scandinavia ===
In the 1660s and early 1670s, the Swedish Empire experienced a financial crisis. In hope of subsidies, Charles XI of Sweden had entered the anti-French Triple Alliance with the Dutch Republic and the Kingdom of England, which broke apart when Charles II of England signed the Treaty of Dover with France in 1670. In April 1672, Sweden and France also concluded an alliance, with France promising subsidies in peace time, and more subsidies in war time, if Sweden maintained a 16,000 men strong army in its German dominions. In December 1674 Sweden invaded Brandenburg after France had threatened to halt its subsidies if the Swedish would not use their army. In June, however, a Swedish army under Carl Gustaf Wrangel was decisively defeated by the Brandenburgian army under Frederick William at Fehrbellin. The Swedish invasion had failed and in September, Imperial and Danish forces attacked Swedish Bremen-Verden.

=== War at sea ===
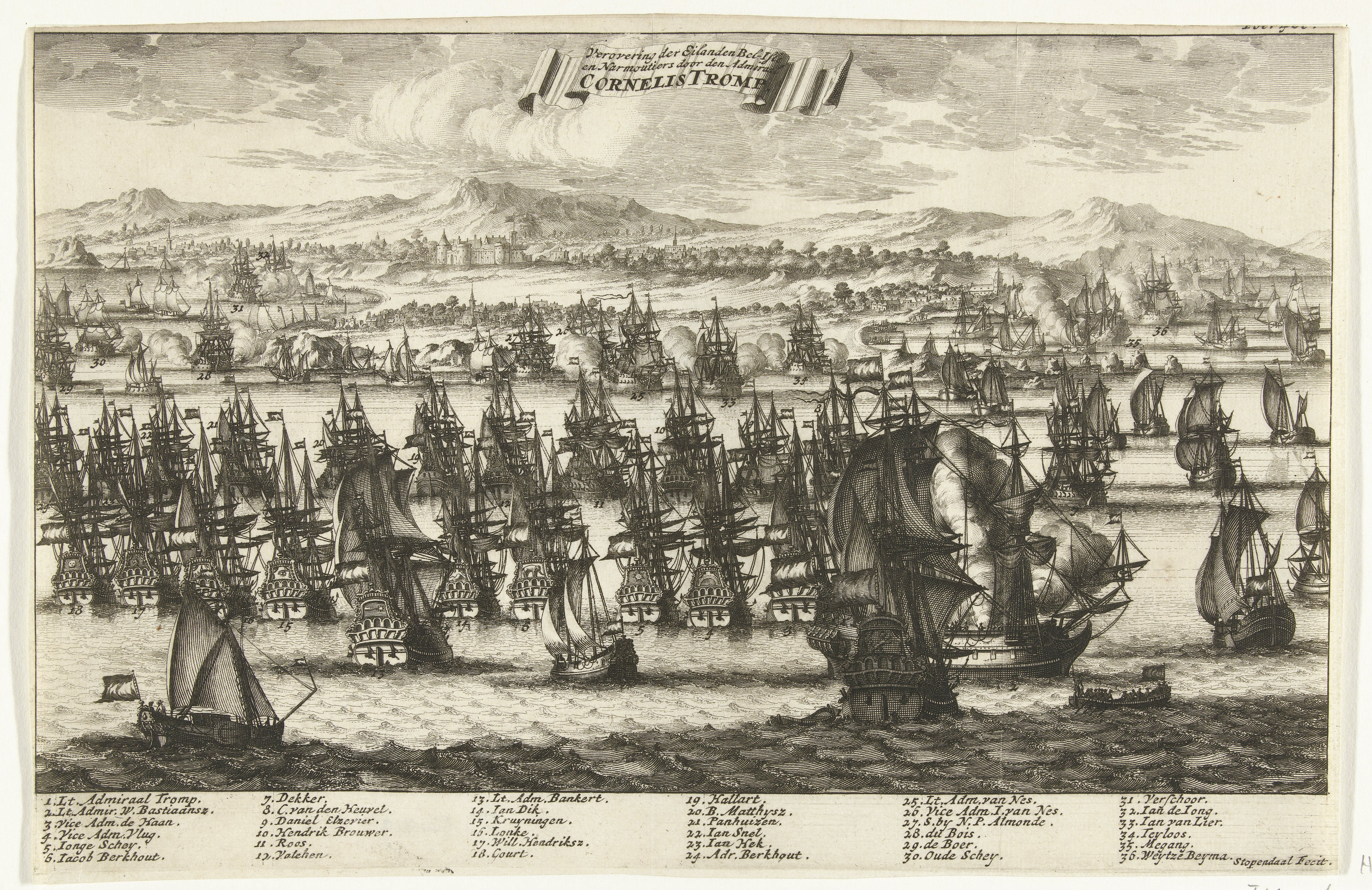
The Capture of Noirmoutier by Cornelis Tromp, 1674

At sea, after the peace with England, the Dutch fleet could now be deployed in an offensive manner. De Ruyter attempted an attack on the French Caribbean islands, but was forced to retreat without having achieved anything. A Dutch fleet under Cornelis Tromp meanwhile operated along the French coast. Tromp directed a landing on 27 June on the island of Belle Île, off the coast of Brittany, and captured its coastal bulwarks. The Dutch, however, left the island again after two days, because the 3,000 French defenders had taken refuge in the island's strong fortress and a siege would have taken too long. A few days later, on 4 July, the island of Noirmoutier was attacked. After a short struggle, which left more than a hundred Dutch men out of action, the French retreated to Poitou, leaving the island, with its castle, coastal batteries, more than 30 pieces of artillery and several ships, in the hands of the Dutch. For nearly three weeks, the Dutch flag flew from the walls of the French stronghold and the Dutch fleet captured many French ships in the meantime. The whole coastline from Brest to Bayonne was in turmoil, and several strong French forces gathered to prevent the Dutch from landing. On 23 July the island of Noirmoutier was however abandoned after the Dutch blew up the castle and demolished the coastal batteries. The French coast was kept in fear for some time, but after ending the French blockade of Cádiz and visiting the Mediterranean, Tromp's fleet returned to Holland at the end of 1674.

== Negotiating the peace: 1676–1678 ==
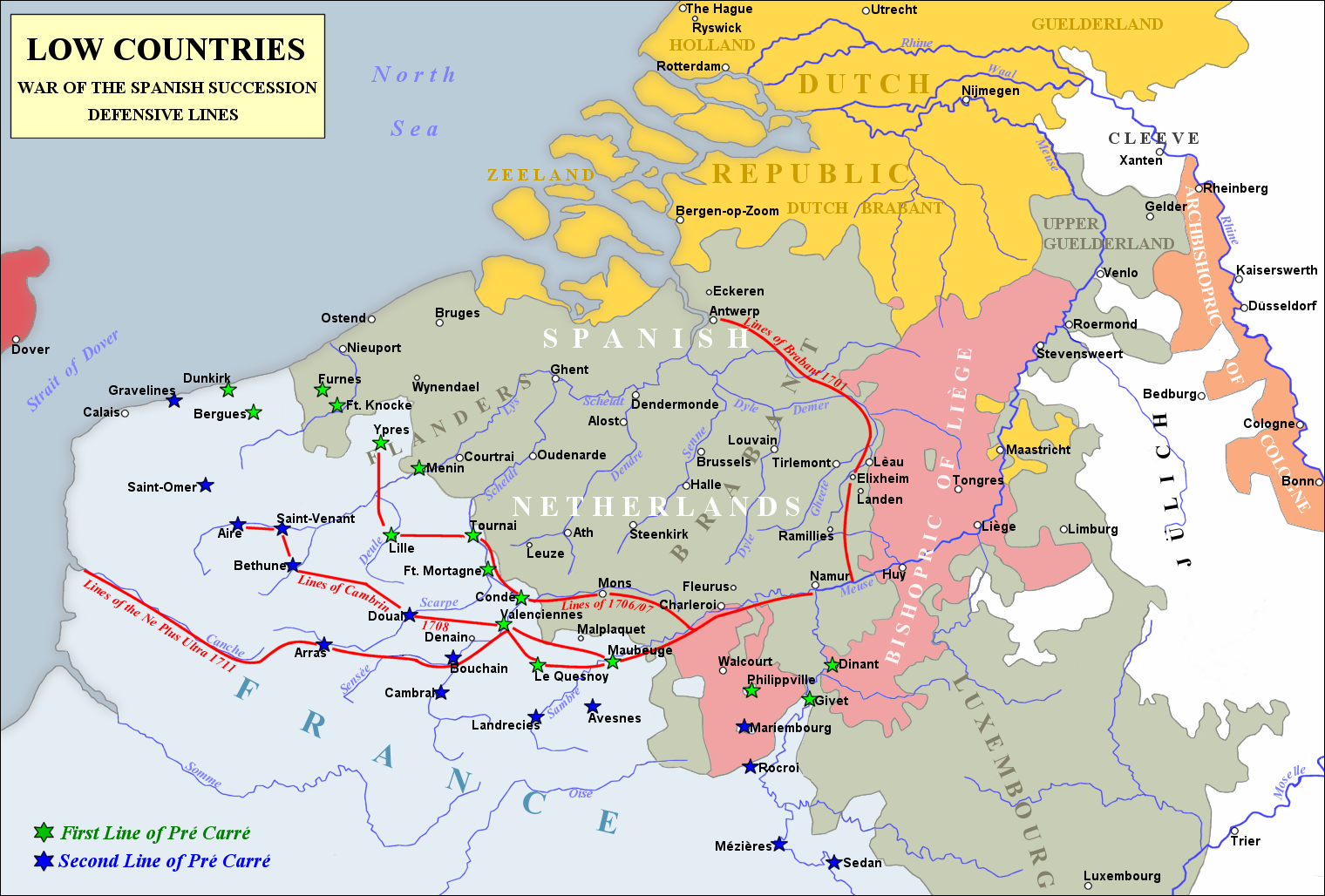
Vauban's proposal for creating a Pré carré or 'duelling zone' on France's northern border, defended by a line of fortresses known as the Ceinture de fer (marked in red and green)

On both sides, the last years of the war saw minimal return for their investment of men and money. French strategy in Flanders was largely based on Vauban's proposed line of fortresses known as the Ceinture de fer or iron belt (see Map). This aligned with Louis' preference for siege warfare, which was further reinforced by the death of Turenne, and Condé's retirement, removing two of the most talented and aggressive French generals of the 17th century, and the only ones with sufficient stature to challenge him. The French were preparing a major offensive at the end of 1676. Intended to capture Valenciennes, Cambrai and Saint-Omer in the Spanish Netherlands, after which the Ceinture de fer was to be largely complete. Louis believed this would deprive the Dutch regenten of the courage to continue the war any longer. In this, however, he was mistaken. The impending French offensive actually led to an intensification of Dutch-Spanish cooperation. Still, the French offensive of 1677 was a success. The Spaniards found it difficult to raise enough troops due to financial constraints and the Allies were defeated in the Battle of Cassel. This meant that they could not prevent the cities from falling into French hands. The French then took a defensive posture, afraid that more success would force England to intervene on the side of the Allies.

In Germany, Imperial forces captured Philippsburg in September 1676 but the French stabilised their front. Créquy's maneuvering countered Imperial offensives by Charles V of Lorraine whereas the French commander succeeded in capturing Freiburg in November 1677. Defeating the Imperials at Rheinfelden and Ortenbach in July 1678 ended their hopes of retaking the city. The French followed up by capturing Kehl and the bridge over the Rhine near Strasbourg, thus ensuring control of Alsace. The Spanish theatre remained largely static; French victory at Espolla in July 1677 left the strategic position unchanged but their losses worsened the crisis faced by the Spanish administration.

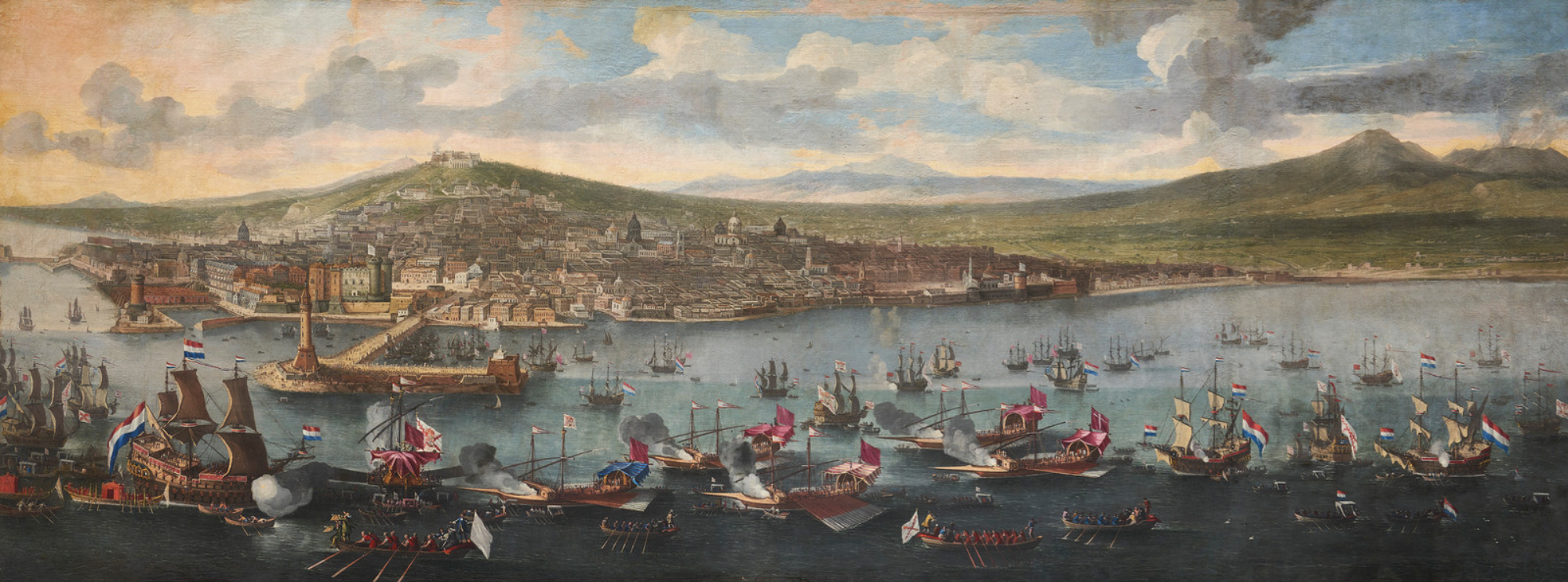
The Viceroy of Naples pays tribute to de Ruyter's fleet in Naples after the Battle of Stromboli by Jan van Essen

Looking to aid Spain in the defense of Sicily, the Dutch Republic sent a small fleet under command of De Ruyter to the Mediterranean Sea. De Ruyter disapproved of the operation, because he thought that his fleet was insufficient to change the balance of power in the Mediterranean, in which the French had a very strong presence. Under pressure from the admiralty he had accepted command anyway. His doubts would soon be justified, but not after he repulsed an attack of a superior French fleet under Abraham Duquesne at Stromboli. Several months later in April 1676 De Ruyter repeated this feat at the Battle of Augusta, but was mortally wounded in the process. The French would achieve naval supremacy in the Western Mediterranean after their galleys surprised the Dutch/Spanish fleet at anchor at Palermo in June. However, French intervention had been opportunistic; friction arose with the anti-Spanish rebels, the cost of operations was prohibitive and Messina was evacuated in early 1678.

In Northern Germany meanwhile the Swedish position crumbled. In 1675, most of Swedish Pomerania and the Duchy of Bremen had been taken by the Brandenburgers, Imperials, and Danes. In December 1677, the elector of Brandenburg captured Stettin. Stralsund fell on 11 October 1678. Greifswald, Sweden's last possession on the continent, was lost on 5 November. Swedish seapower was annihilated, by the Danish and Dutch fleets under Niels Juel and Cornelis Tromp after the battles of Öland and Køge Bay, but the Danish invasion of Scania was less successful. After the very bloody Battle of Lund and the Battle of Landskrona the main body of the Danish forces was moved to southern Denmark, but the hostilities in Scania did not cease until September 1679.

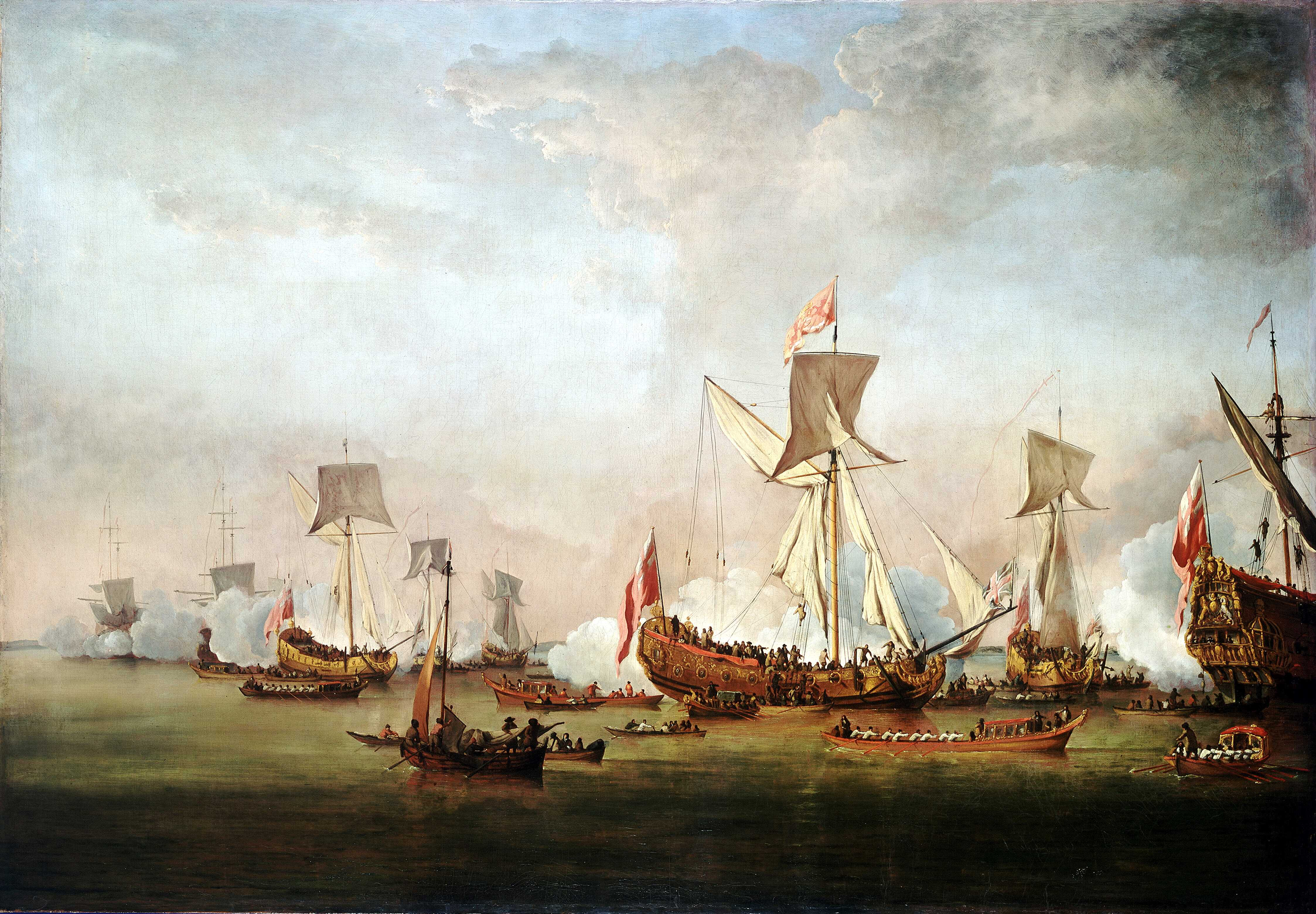
The departure of William of Orange and Princess Mary for Holland, November 1677.

The peace talks that began at Nijmegen in 1676 were given a greater sense of urgency in November 1677 when William married his cousin Mary Stuart, Charles II of England's niece. An Anglo-Dutch defensive alliance followed in March 1678, although English troops did not arrive in significant numbers until late May. Louis seized this opportunity to improve his negotiating position and captured Ypres and Ghent in early March, before signing a peace treaty with the Dutch on 10 August.

The Battle of Saint-Denis was fought three days later on 13 August, when a combined Dutch-Spanish force attacked the French army under Luxembourg. The French were forced to withdraw, which ensured that Mons remained in Spanish hands. On 19 August, Spain and France agreed to an armistice, followed by a formal peace treaty on 17 September.

== 1678: the Peace of Nijmegen and its consequences ==
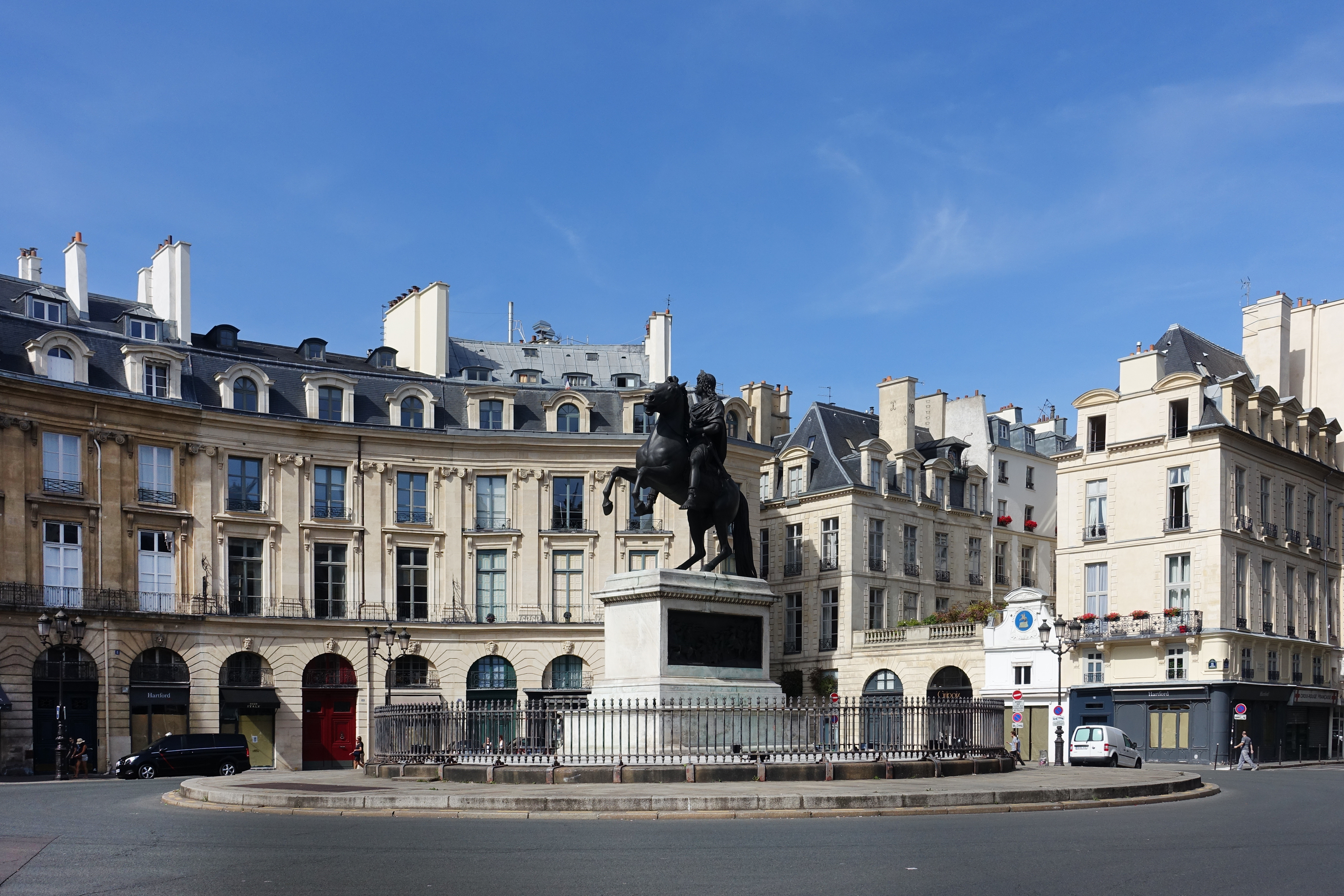
The Place des Victoires; built to celebrate French victory in 1678

Louis XIV's two primary goals, the destruction of the Dutch Republic and the conquest of the Spanish Netherlands, had not been achieved. (Note: Though it only mentions the French invasion of the Dutch Republic, Robert Fruin does say that Louis XIV's invasion was a failure, because the French goals were to humiliate the Dutch Republic, eliminate its influence and power and plunder the Republic and take its riches away. Although the French army did plunder some towns of the Dutch Republic it was only to a small extent, and the French failed to achieve the rest) Nevertheless, the Peace of Nijmegen confirmed most of the conquests the French had made in the latter stages of the war. Louis, having successfully fought a powerful coalition, came to be known as the 'Sun King' in the years that followed the conflict. France returned Charleroi, Ghent and other towns in the Spanish Netherlands, while receiving the entire Franche-Comté and the towns of Ypres, Maubeuge, Câteau-Cambrésis, Valenciennes, Saint-Omer and Cassel; with the exception of Ypres, all of these remain part of France today. But while favourable to France, and producing lasting gains, the peace terms were significantly worse than those that had been available in July 1672.

The Dutch recovered from the near disaster of 1672 to prove they were a significant power in Northern Europe. They ended the war without losing an inch of their own territory, obtained the French evacuation of several advanced positions conquered in 1668 and the repeal of the rigorous customs tariff of 1667, which had been designed, by Jean-Baptiste Colbert, to hinder their trade. Arguably, their most lasting gain was William's marriage to Mary and his arrival as one of the most powerful statesmen in Europe, with sufficient stature to hold together an anti-French coalition. It also showed that while significant sections of the English mercantile and political class were anti-Dutch on commercial grounds, there was no popular support in England for an alliance with France. However, the advantageous separate peace, signed against William's wishes, meant that the Republic's allies were in a worse position. For years afterwards the Republic was burdened with the reputation of being an untrustworthy ally, concerned only with its commercial interests. The war had also seen the rebirth of the Dutch States Army as one of the most disciplined and best trained European armed forces. That this was not sufficient to keep France from making conquests in the Spanish Netherlands, William and the regenten blamed mainly on the Spanish themselves. The Dutch had expected more military strength from the once powerful Spanish Empire.

In Spain, defeat led to the Queen Regent, Mariana of Austria, being replaced by her long-term rival, the pro-French John of Austria the Younger. She returned to power after his death in September 1679 but not before he arranged the marriage of Charles II of Spain to Louis' niece, 17-year-old Marie Louise of Orléans in November 1679.

Brandenburg managed to occupy Swedish Pomerania completely in September 1678, France's ally Sweden regained it by the 1679 Treaty of Saint-Germain-en-Laye but this did little to improve its perilous financial position. In addition, Frederick William's resentment at being forced to give up what he saw as his own territory turned Brandenburg-Prussia into an implacable opponent.

Louis had the enormous advantages of a stellar corps of commanders, superior logistics and a unified strategy, in contrast to the differing objectives of his opponents. At the same time, the war demonstrated that the threat of French expansion overruled all other considerations for rival nations and that France, though having emerged as Europe's greatest power, could not easily impose its will against a coalition. French forces would soon capture Strasbourg (in 1681) and triumph in the brief War of the Reunions (1683–1684), which only further alienated other European states and led to the creation of the anti-French Grand Alliance in 1688, which largely held together through the 1688–1697 Nine Years' War (1688–1697) and the War of the Spanish Succession (1701–1714).

== Gallery ==
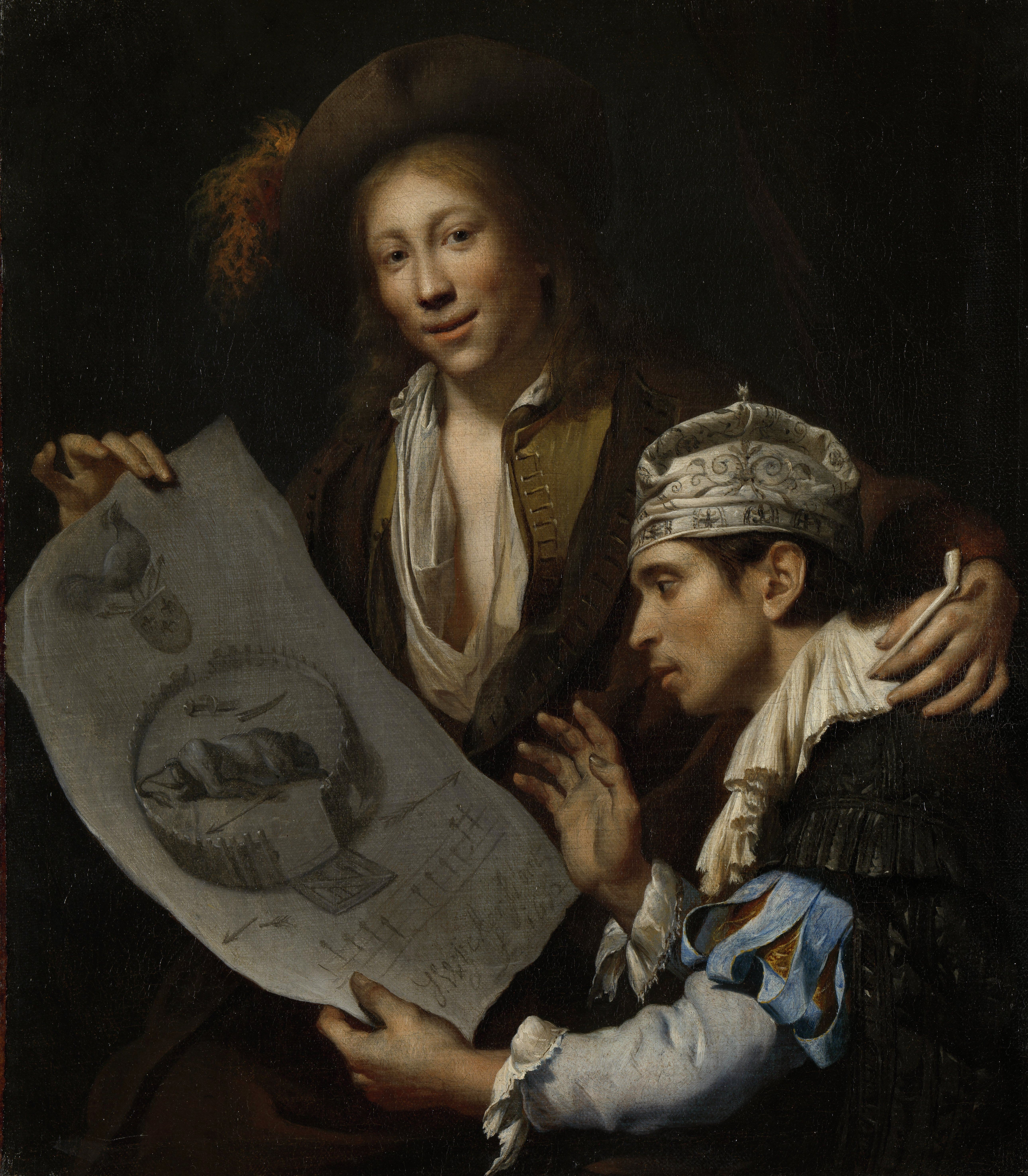
Allegory on the French invasion of the Dutch Republic

Battle of Texel

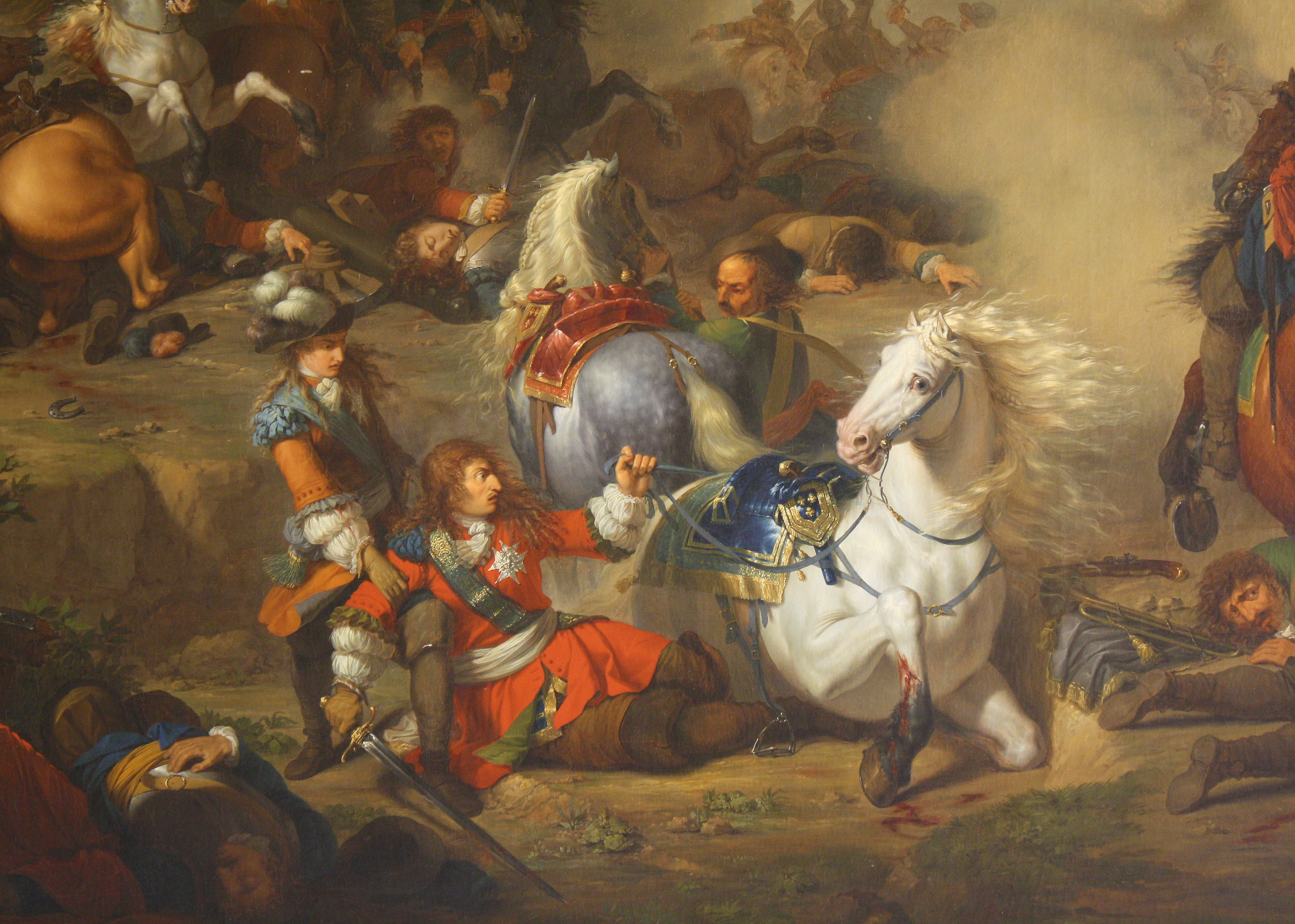
Battle of Seneffe

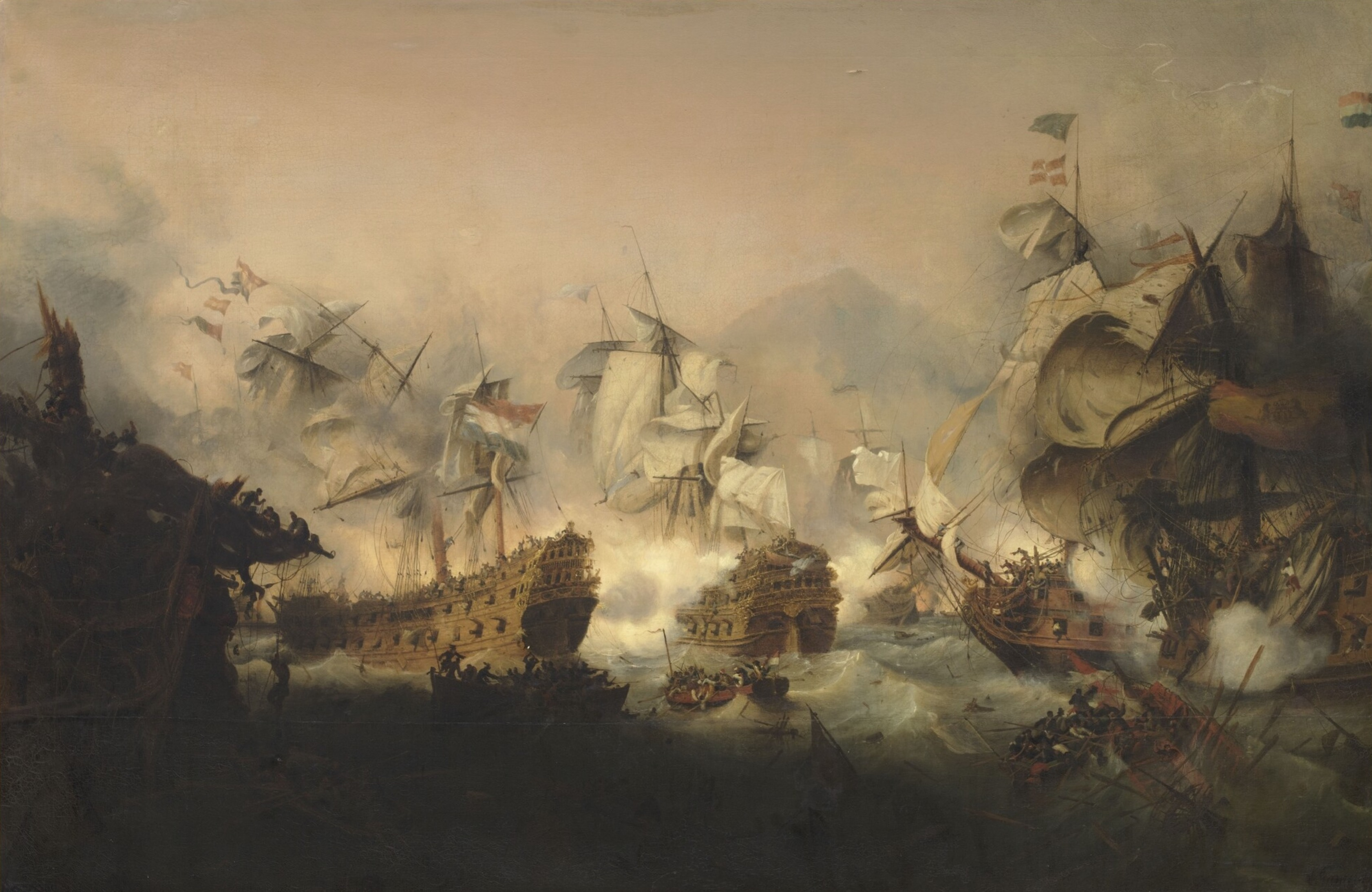
Battle of Augusta

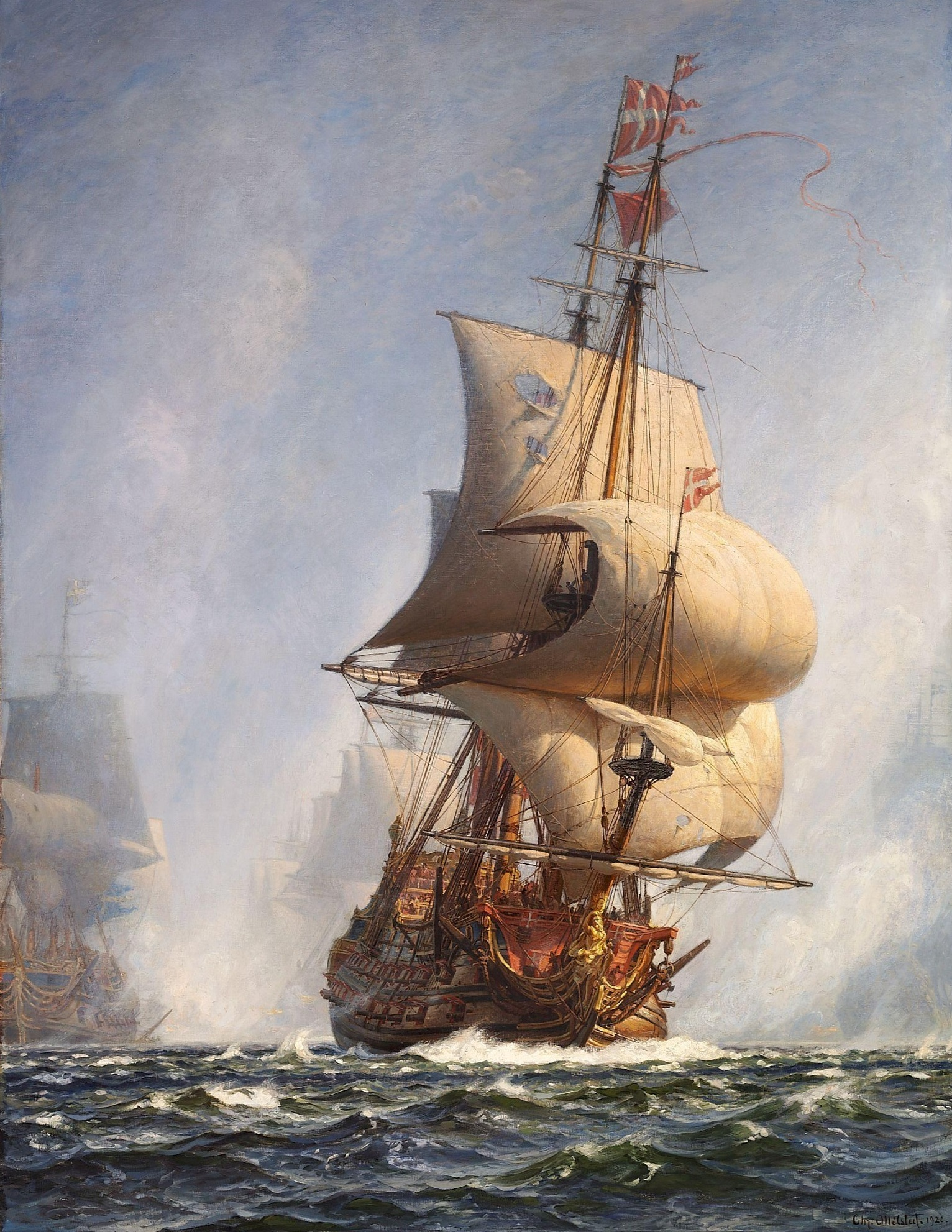
Battle of Køge Bay

== See also ==
- List of areas in the Dutch Republic destroyed or damaged during the Franco-Dutch War
- Louis XIV Victory Monument
