= 's-Graveland =

- Village
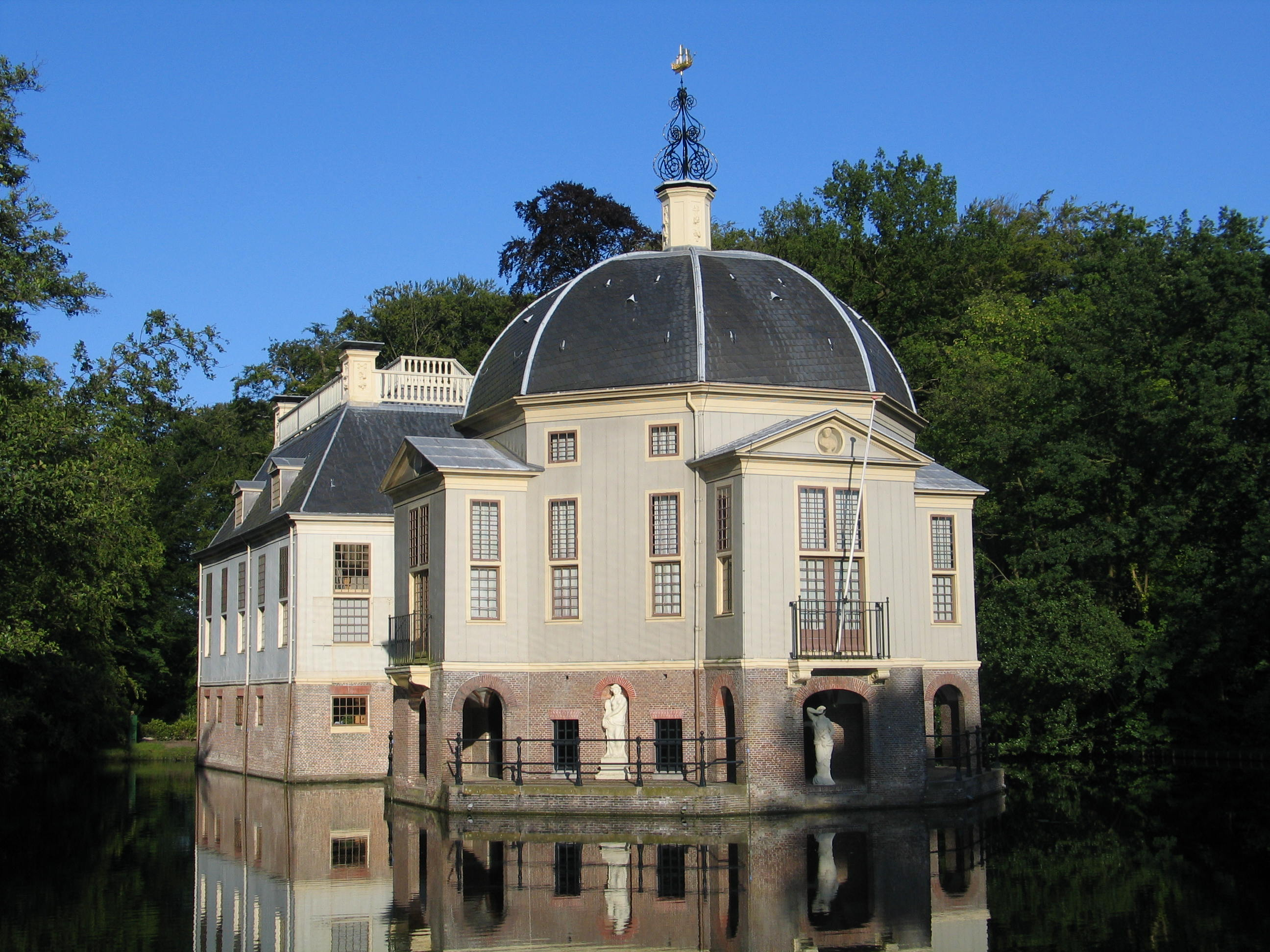
- The Trompenburgh

- Coat of arms

- Location in the Netherlands Location in the province of North Holland in the Netherlands
- Coordinates: 52°14′39″N 5°7′16″E
- Country: Netherlands
- Province: North Holland and part of Gooi
- Municipality: Wijdemeren

Area
  - Total: 5.55 km^{2} (2.14 sq mi)
- Elevation: 0.5 m (1.6 ft)

Population (2021)
  - Total: 1,320
  - Density: 238/km^{2} (616/sq mi)
- Time zone: UTC+1 (CET)
  - Summer (DST): UTC+2 (CEST)
- Postal code: 1243
- Dialing code: 035

's-Graveland (Dutch pronunciation: [sxraːvəˈlɑnt]) is a village in the Dutch province of North Holland. It is a part of the municipality of Wijdemeren, and lies about 4 km northwest of Hilversum. The former municipality of 's-Graveland merged with Loosdrecht and Nederhorst den Berg on 1 January 2002 to form the new municipality Wijdemeren.

The village was first mentioned in 1634 as "de akkers in 's Graevenlandt" and means "the land of Count of Holland" (Albrecht van Beieren) and served as a hunting ground. This area was cultivated from 1625; nine years later the resulting polder was parceled out to six people. A popular location for the country estates of Amsterdam burghers, the village contains several historic houses dating mostly to the 17th century.

== Early history ==
Transport by ship, initially via the Zuiderzee and the Utrechtse Vecht, was often preferred over carriage. The road to Weesp was improved in 1627. The 's-Gravelandseweg was not paved. The 's-Gravelandsevaart, dug out in 1634, used to be a major connection between Vecht and Loosdrecht. In 1634, Andries Bicker became the owner of five plots with a depth of about 1,100m in 's-Graveland. The Weespertrekvaart was dug out in 1639. Ships transported the excavated sand to Amsterdam. In 1644, a regular barge to Amsterdam was introduced, and not long after, a school and church were built, designed by Daniel Stalpaert. The village became a popular location for wealthy families from Amsterdam, who bought, built or inherited villas and estates there. Most of these villas remain in s'Graveland, including Trompenburgh, a mansion in Dutch Baroque style built for Cornelis Tromp and designed by Daniel Stalpaert. The area was heavily damaged by French forces early in the Franco-Dutch War.

== Notable people ==
- Gustav Leonhardt (1928–2012), Dutch keyboard player, conductor, musicologist, teacher and editor
- Tjalling Koopmans (1910–1985), Dutch-American mathematician and economist and winner of the 1975 Nobel Memorial Prize in Economic Sciences
- Hendrik Jan Schimmel
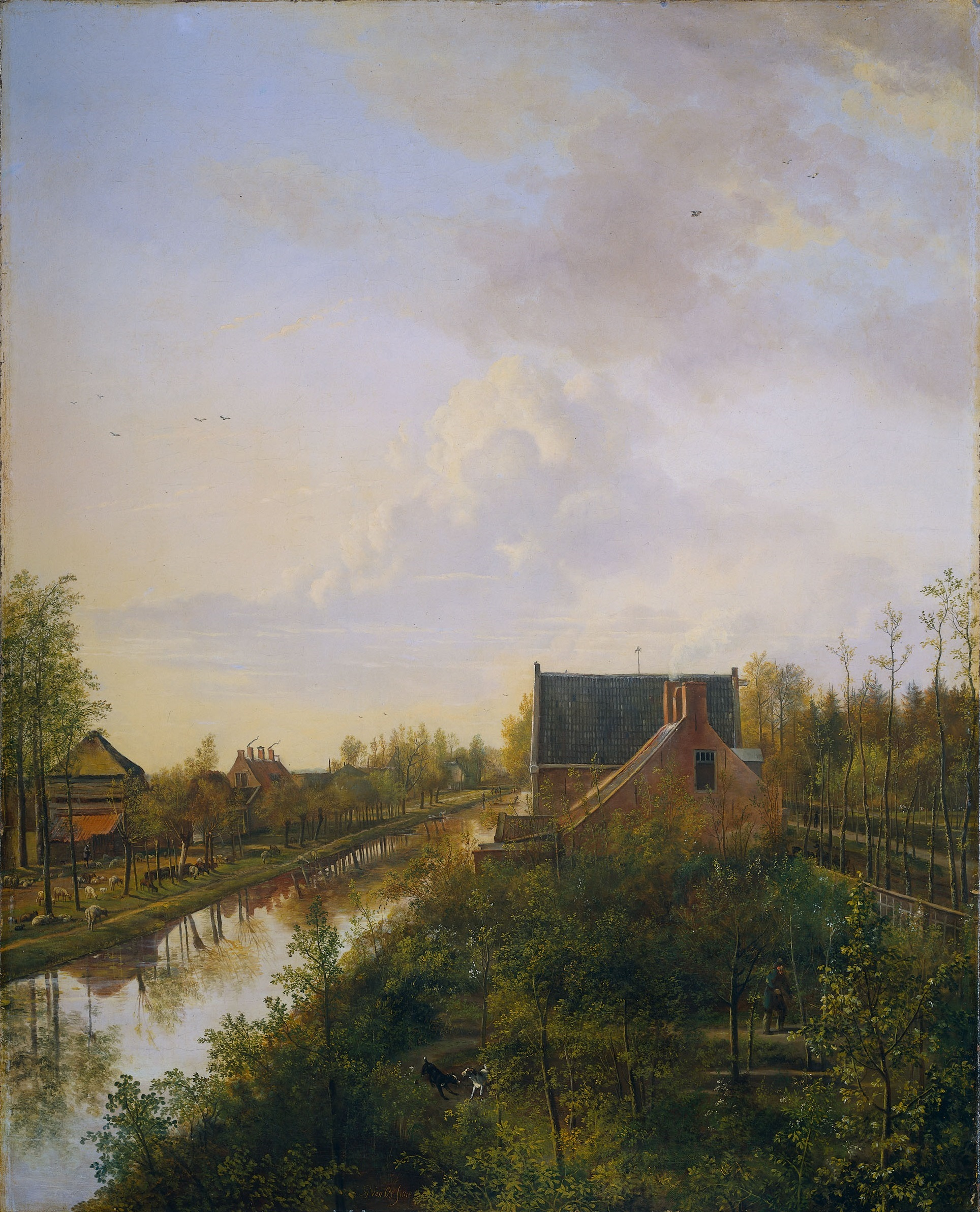
Pieter van Os's Gravelandse kanaal

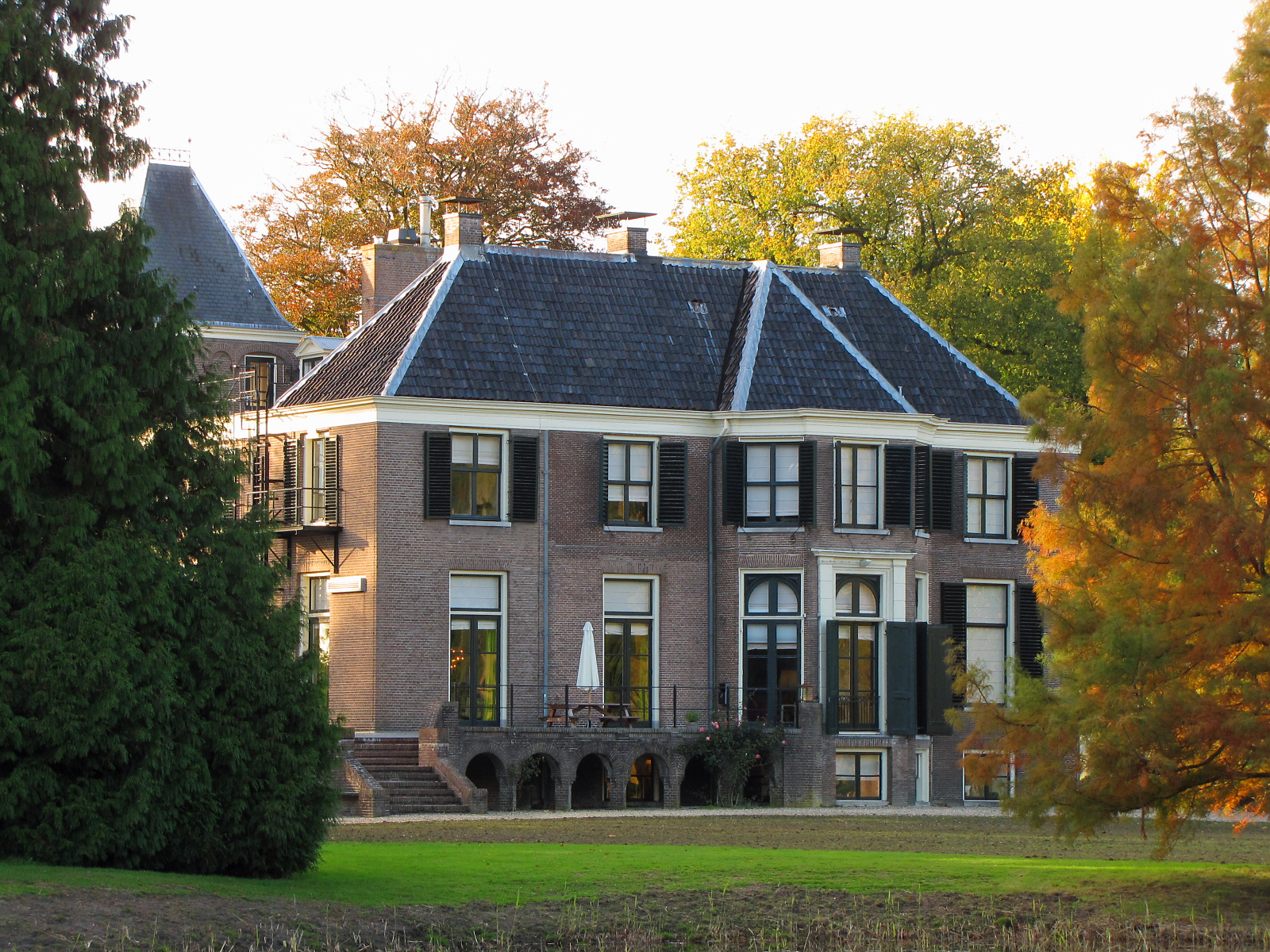
Boekesteyn landhuis

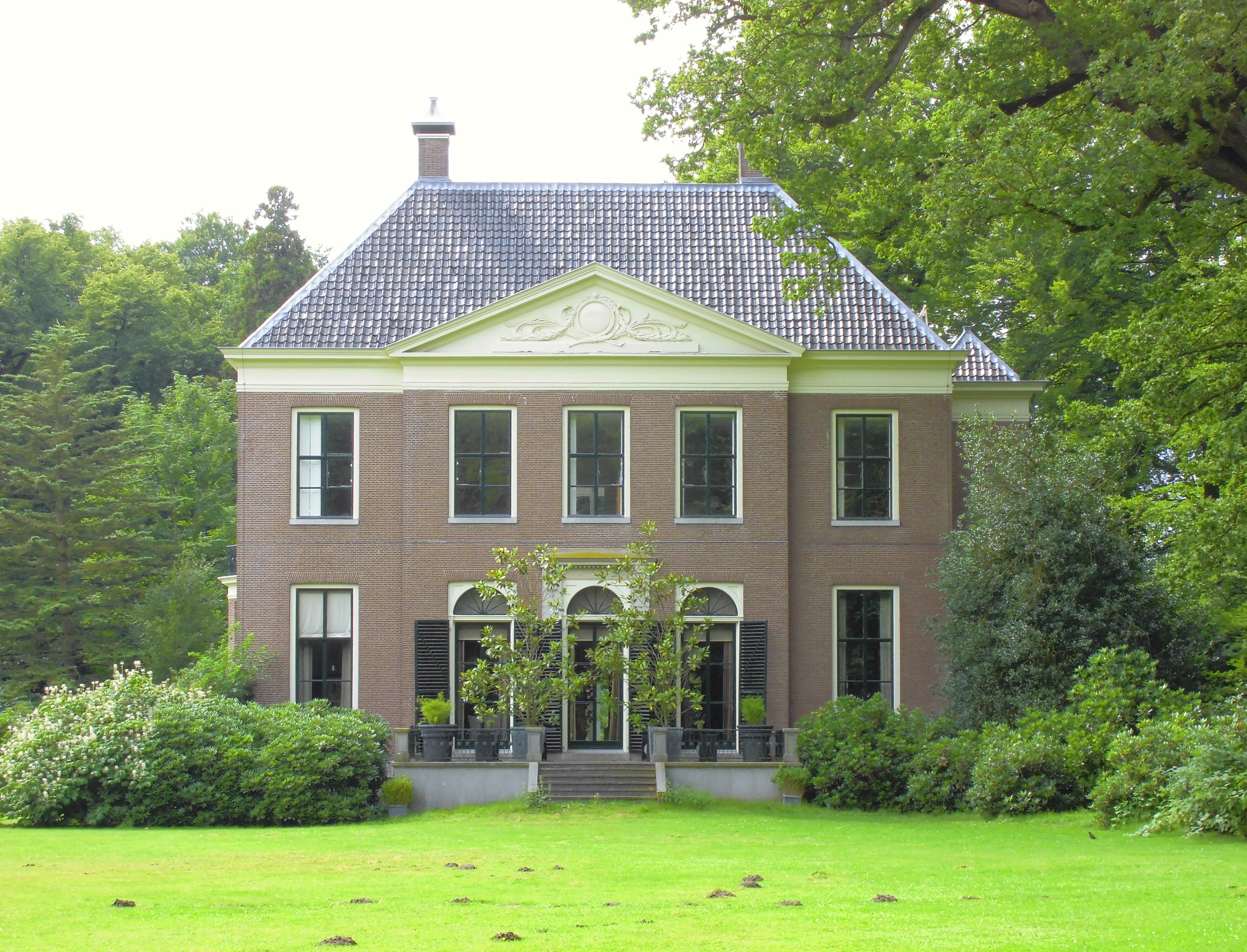
Gooilust
