= Landing at Ystad =

1676 invasion and battle in Sweden

- Part of the Scanian War
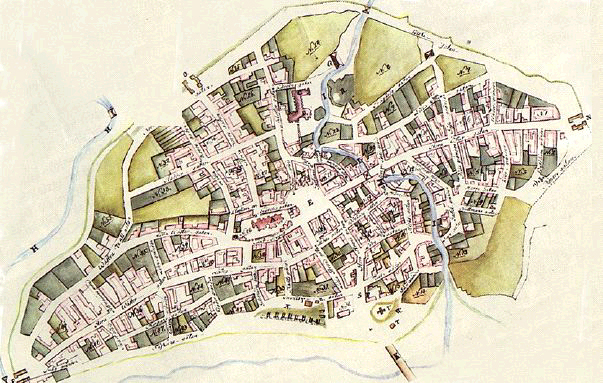
- Reconstruction of a map of Ystad from c. 1700
Date	27 June 1676
Location	Ystad, Sweden 55°25′N 13°50′E
Result	Dano-Dutch victory
Territorial changes	Ystad is temporarily conquered by Denmark-Norway

Belligerents
Denmark-Norway; Dutch Republic	(yes) Swedish Empire

Commanders and leaders
(Denmark–Norway) Cornelis Tromp (Denmark–Norway) Niels Juel	(Swedish Empire) Otto Fersen (Swedish Empire) Johan Leonard Wittenberg

Units involved
Unknown	(Swedish Empire) Ystad garrison (Swedish Empire) Guard companies

Strength
Some lightships 1 galiot 4,000 soldiers and sailors	+1,500 cavalry

Casualties and losses
Unknown	2 officers 100 men

The Landing at Ystad (Danish: Landgangen ved Ysted, Swedish: Landningen vid Ystad), also known as the Battle of Ystad, (Danish: Slaget ved Ysted, Swedish: Slaget vid Ystad) was an amphibious attack and landing at Ystad performed by a Dano-Dutch fleet on 27 June 1676 during the Scanian War. The landing was a success, and the Swedish garrison and relief force were forced to retreat.

== Background ==
In the summer of 1675 Denmark–Norway declared war on Sweden with the goal to reconquer Denmark and Norway's lost territories in 1645 and 1658. After a combined Dano-Dutch fleet defeated the Swedish fleet at Öland, the former could thereafter pursue an amphibious landing across the Sound. The commanders of the Dano-Dutch fleet, Cornelis Tromp and Niels Juel, found Ystad to have a small garrison and could thus more easily be overtaken.

== Landing ==
As soon as the Swedish garrison at Ystad saw the Dano-Dutch fleet, they sent message to Malmö, in which Charles XI sent a relief force of 1,500 cavalrymen and soon after guard companies too. Already on 26 June, Tromp and his ships had launched fire upon the Swedish garrison, however, the landing itself would take place the next day. On the morning of 27 June, the landing was initiated. Tromp and Juel sailed their frigate towards land and ordered their seamen and landing troops to be as loud as possible. The landing resulted in a success and the cavalry garrison was conquered.

=== Second confrontation ===
Concurrently, the Swedish relief forces, led by Otto von Fersen and Johan Wittenberg, arrived and battle ensued again. Under fighting came also the guard companies, however, the ships' fire supported the Dano-Dutch troops so well that the Swedes would retreat. The Swedish death toll was two officers and 100 men.

== Aftermath ==
When the outcome of the battle reached Malmö, King Charles marched to Ystad to drive out the Danes, however, the march would be given up when finding out that the Danes had embarked on the ships again. Two days later, on 29 June, Christian V of Denmark would land at Raa near Helsingborg and the main invasion had begun.

== See also ==
- Battle of Lund – 1676 battle of the Scanian War
- Surrender of Tribsees – 1675 military surrender in Germany
- Invasion of Gotland (1676) – Danish invasion of Gotland in 1676

== Works cited ==
- Jensen, N.P (1900). Den Skaanske Krig [The Scanian War] (PDF) (in Danish). DET NORDISKE FORLAG.
- Barfod, Jørgen (1977). Niels Juel (PDF). Marinehistorisk selskab.
- Prud'homme van Reine, Ronald (2001). Schittering en schandaal: biografie van Maerten en Cornelis Tromp [Splendor and Scandal: Biography of Maerten and Cornelis Tromp] (in Dutch). Amsterdam: De Arbeiderspers. ISBN 9029535725.
