= Calming the storm =

Miracle carried out by Jesus according to the Bible

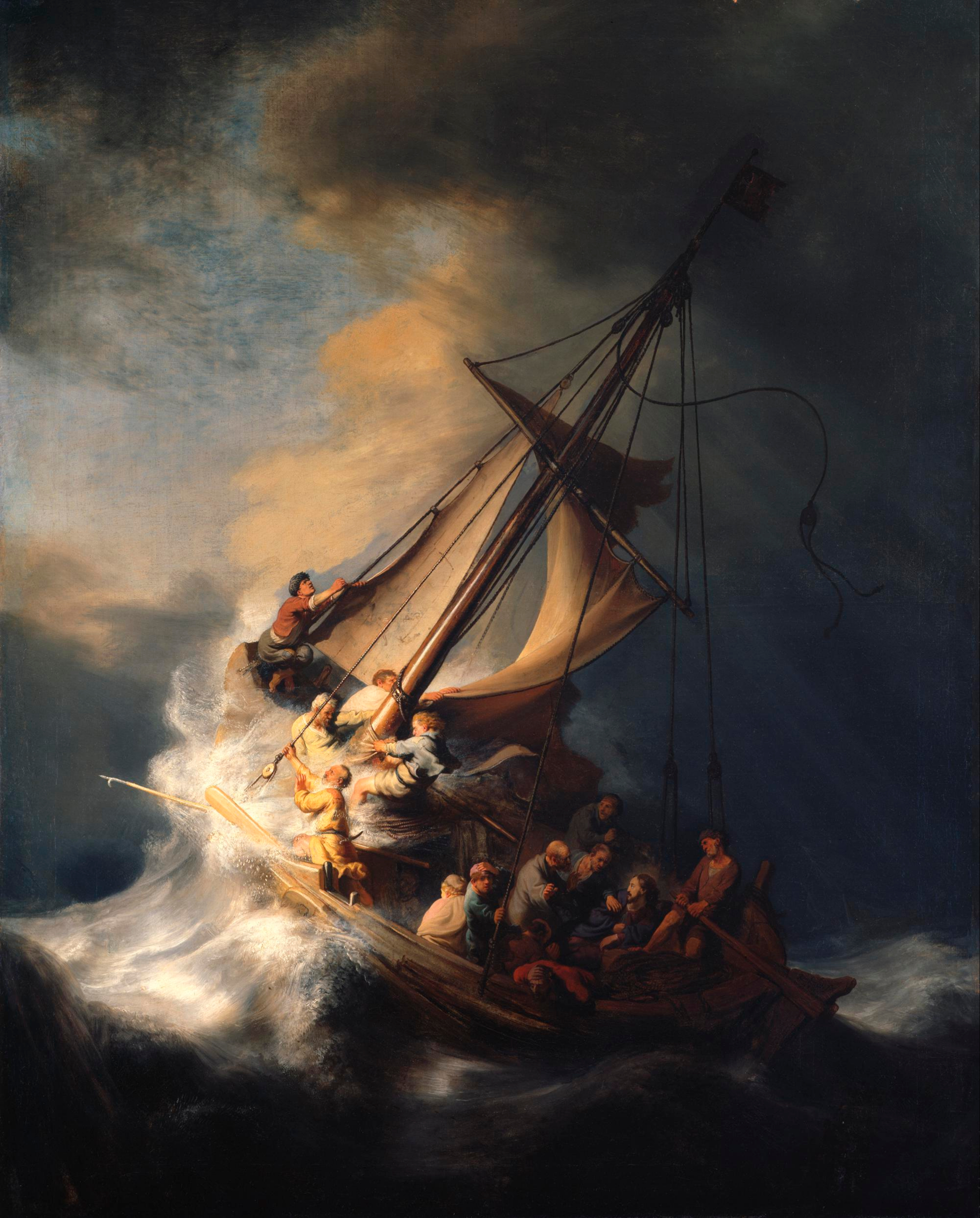
The Storm on the Sea of Galilee by Rembrandt, 1632

Calming the storm is one of the miracles of Jesus in the Gospels, reported in Matthew 8:23–27, Mark 4:35–41, and Luke 8:22–25 (the Synoptic Gospels). This episode is distinct from Jesus' walk on water, which also involves a boat on the lake and appears later in the narrative.

== Biblical accounts ==
According to the Gospels, one evening Jesus and his disciples were crossing the Sea of Galilee in a boat. Suddenly a furious storm came up, with the waves breaking over the boat so that it was nearly swamped. Jesus was asleep on a cushion in the stern, and the disciples woke him and asked, "Teacher, don't you care if we drown?" The Gospel of Mark then states that:

He then rebuked the wind, and said to the sea, "Peace! Be still!" Then the wind ceased, and there was a dead calm. He said to them, "Why are you afraid? Have you still no faith?" And they were filled with great awe and said to one another, "Who then is this, that even the wind and the sea obey him?”

== Analysis ==
Author Michael Keene commented that the Sea of Galilee was known for its sudden and fierce storms and that the Jews were people of the land who were generally uncomfortable at sea, especially since they believed the sea to be full of frightening creatures. The Pulpit Commentary attributes these sudden storms to winds arising on the summits of Mount Hermon, in the Anti-Lebanon mountains to the north.

The Anglican clergyman John Clowes commented that by asking the question "Why are you so afraid?", Jesus was asking his disciples to explore in their own minds the cause and origin of fear, so they would realize that all fear has its roots in natural affection and thought, separate from spiritual affection and thought. And by asking "Do you still have no faith?" Jesus was manifestly pointing to a defect in their spiritual principles. Clowes further commented that by that last question Jesus was manifestly instructing his disciples, and through them all future generations of mankind, that fear is the constant result of the want of Heavenly principles in the human mind.

Justus Knecht notes that the objects of this miracle were:

1. "to increase and strengthen the faith of the apostles", and
2. "to teach the apostles and their successors that they, as fishers of men, would be exposed to many persecutions and afflictions; but that Jesus would always be with them to hush the storm".

== Artworks ==
Calming the storm in art

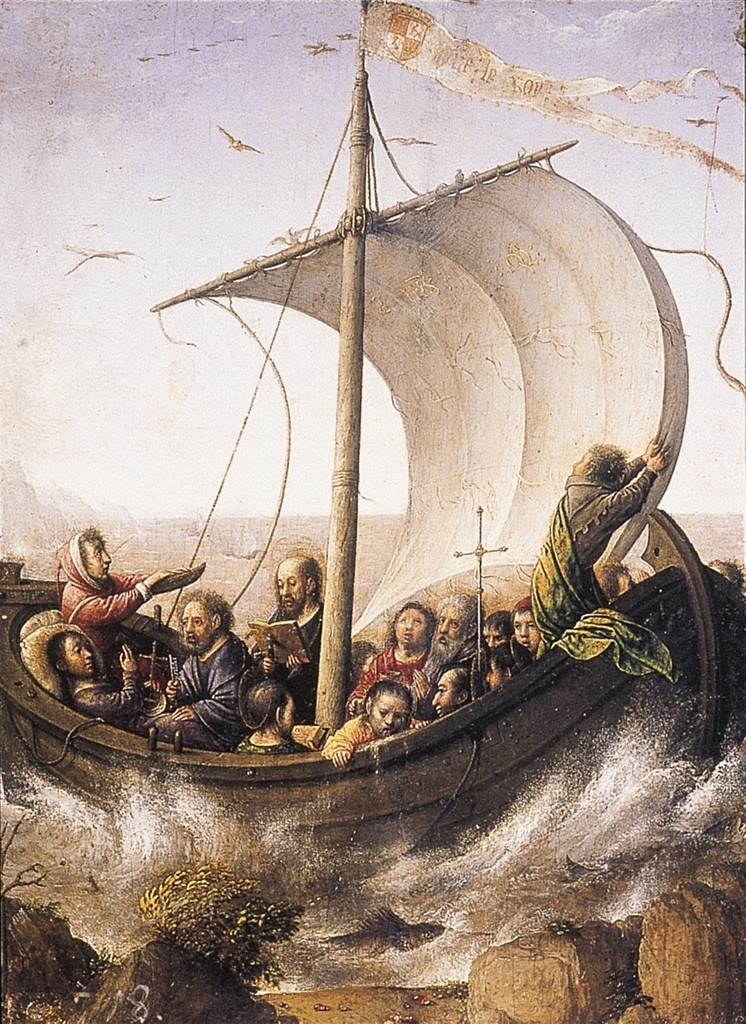
Juan de Flandes 1490–1500

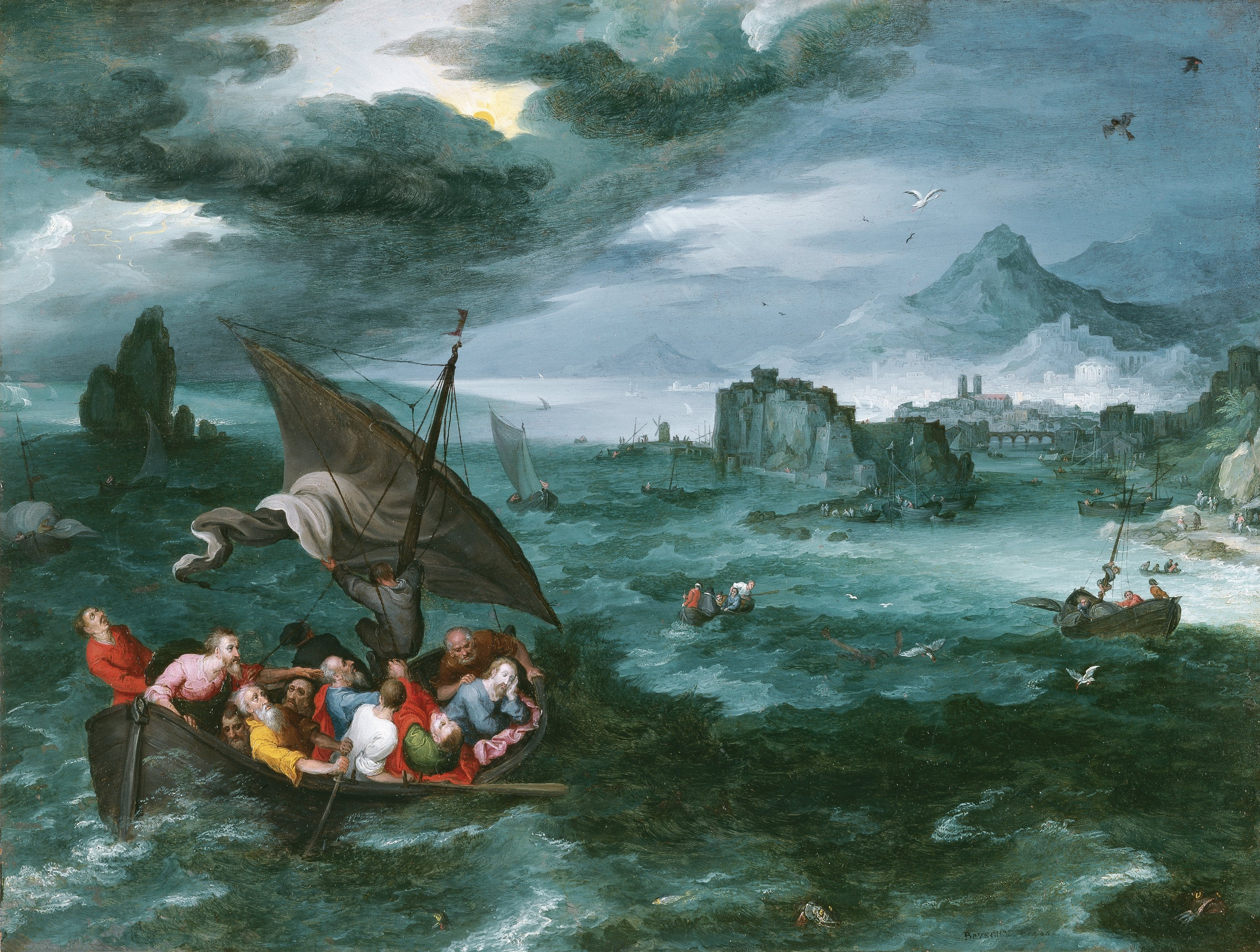
Jan Brueghel the Elder 1596

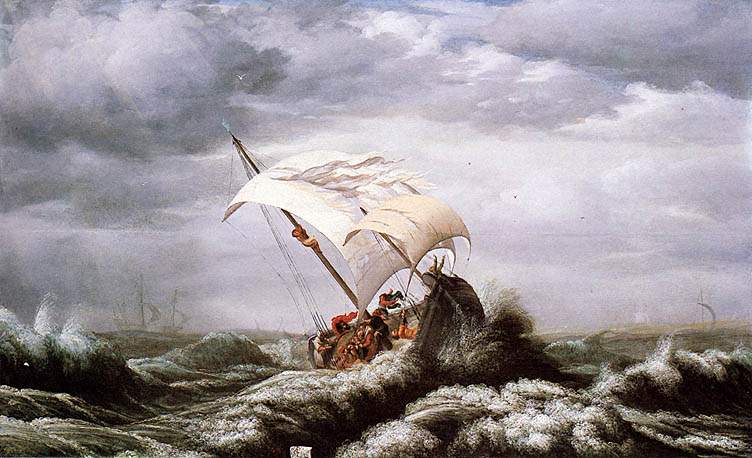
Pieter Stalpaert 1617

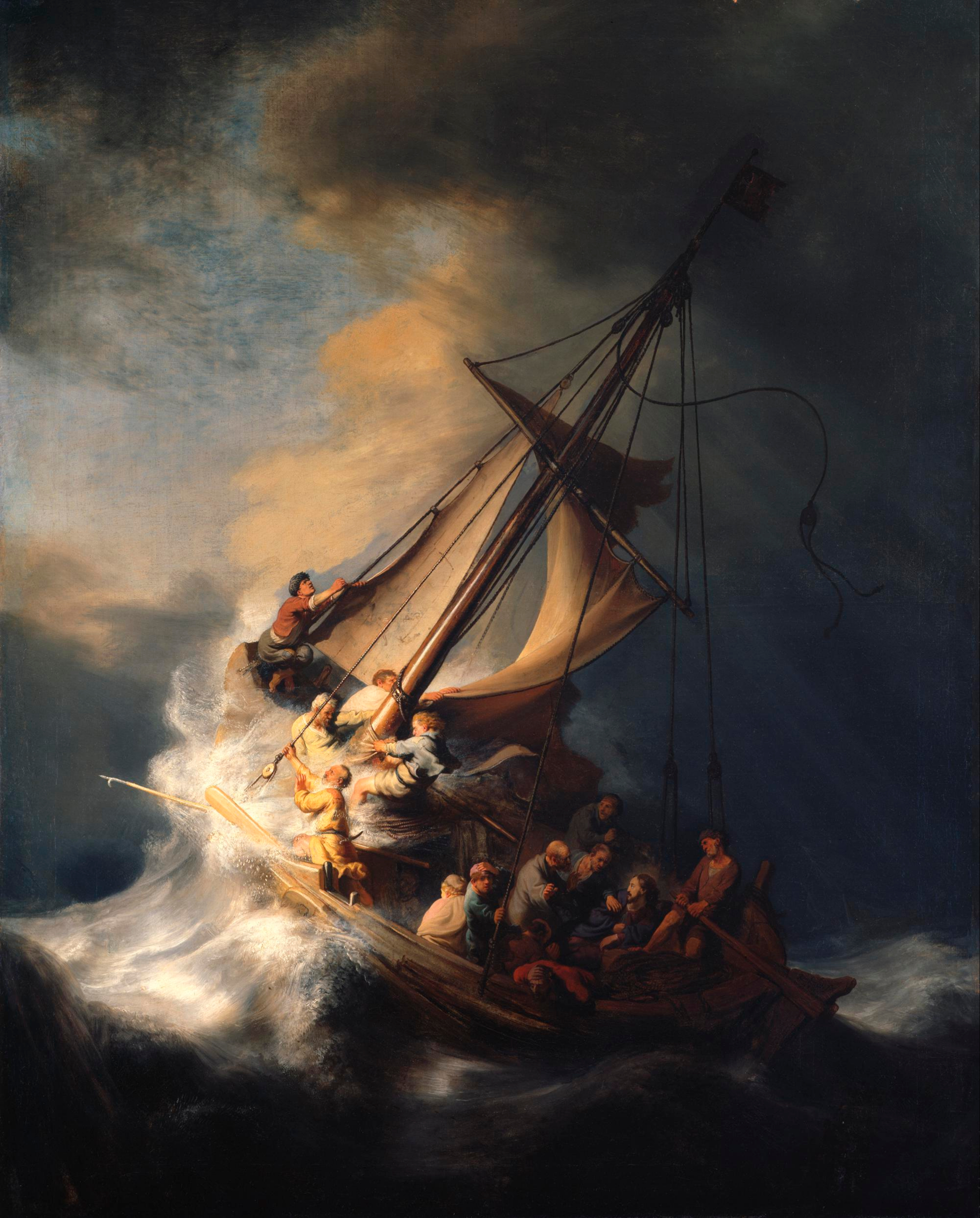
Rembrandt 1633

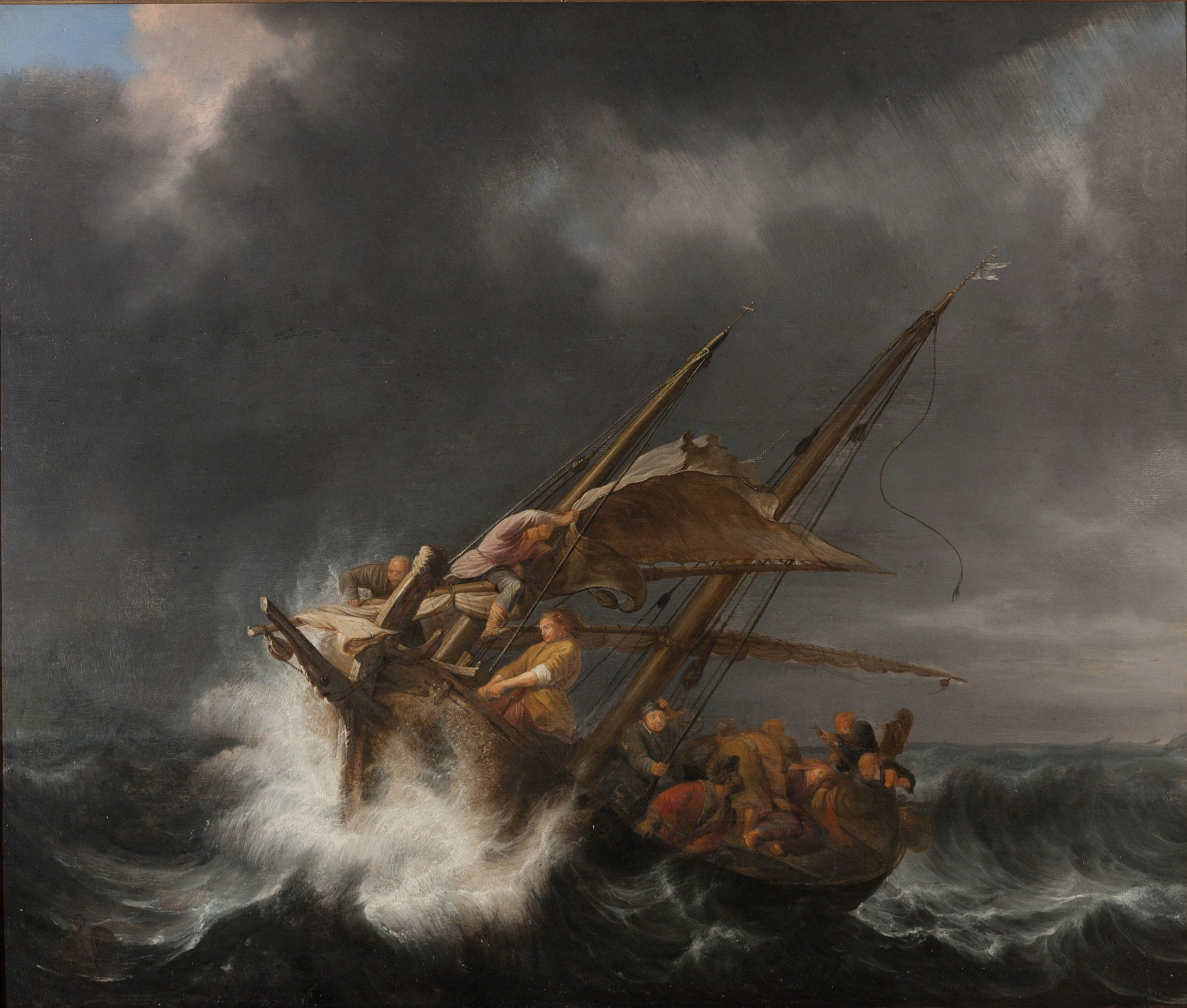
Simon de Vlieger 1637

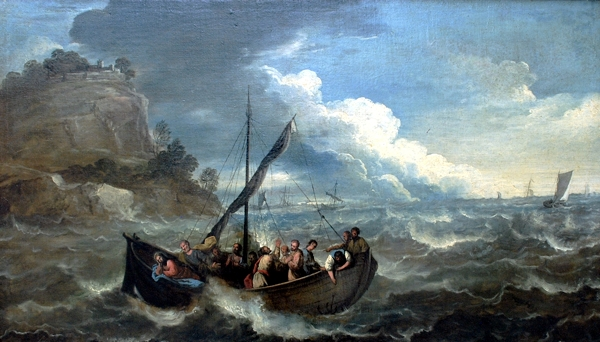
Cornelis de Wael 1630s

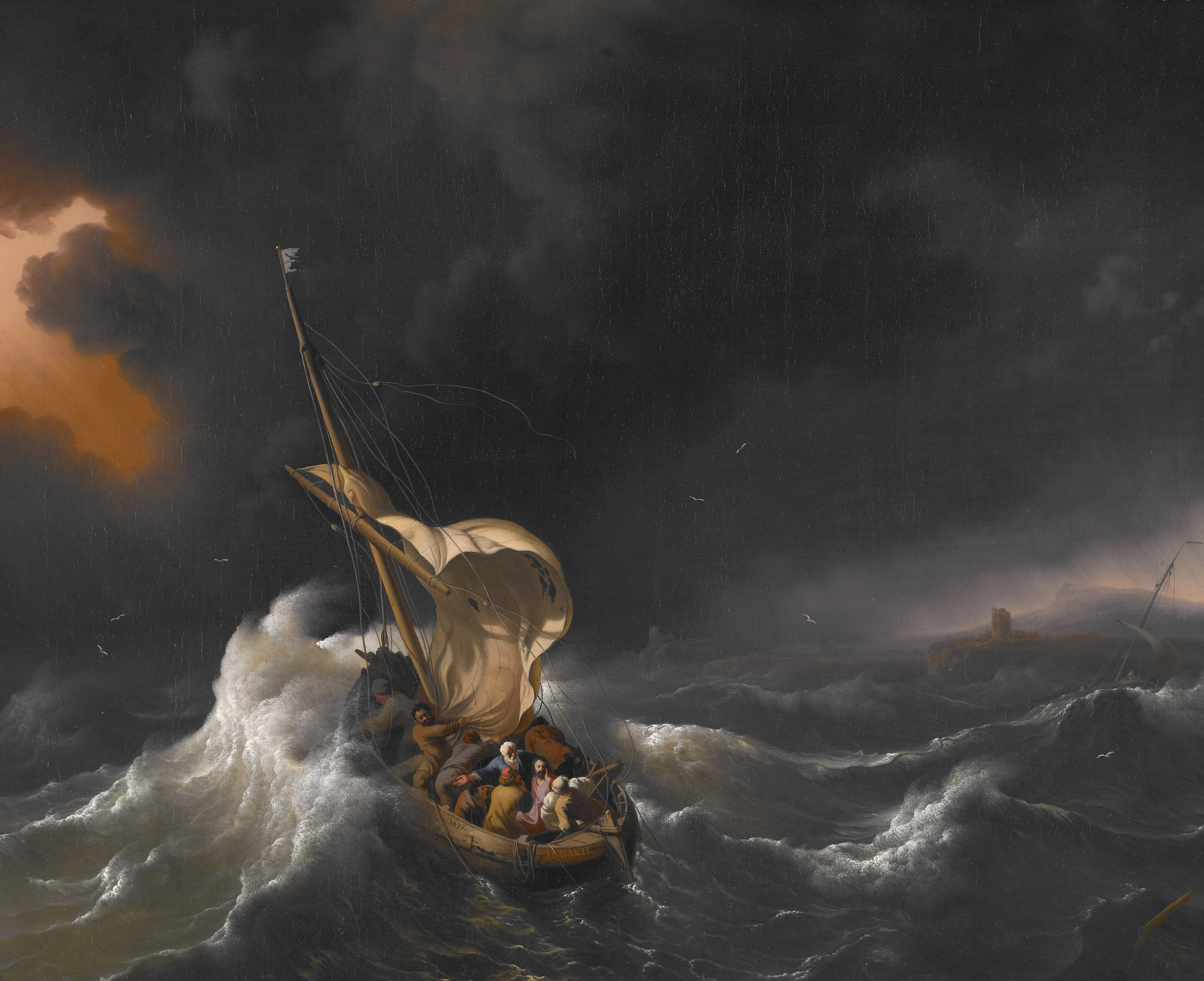
Ludolf Bakhuizen 1695

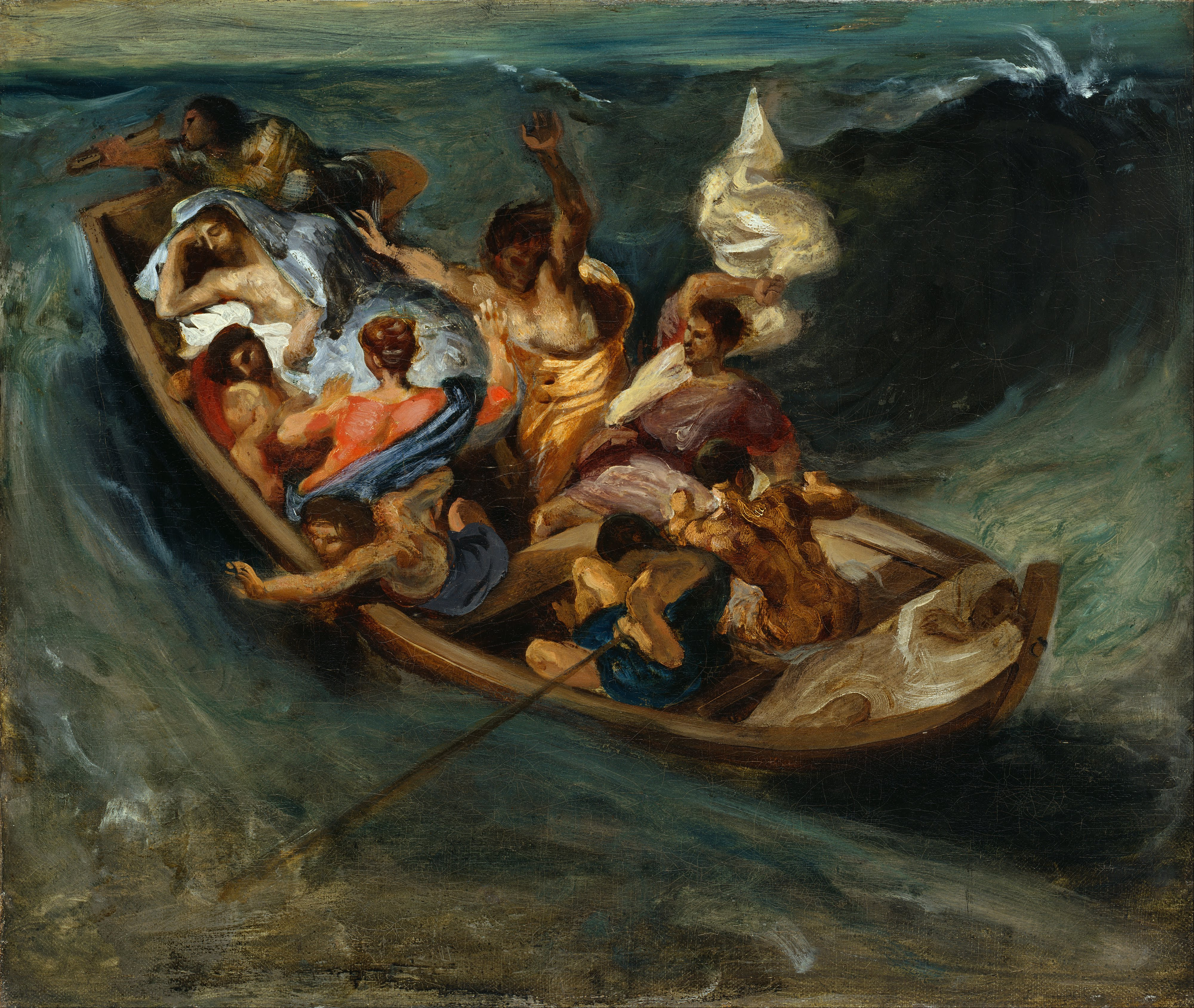
Eugène Delacroix 1854

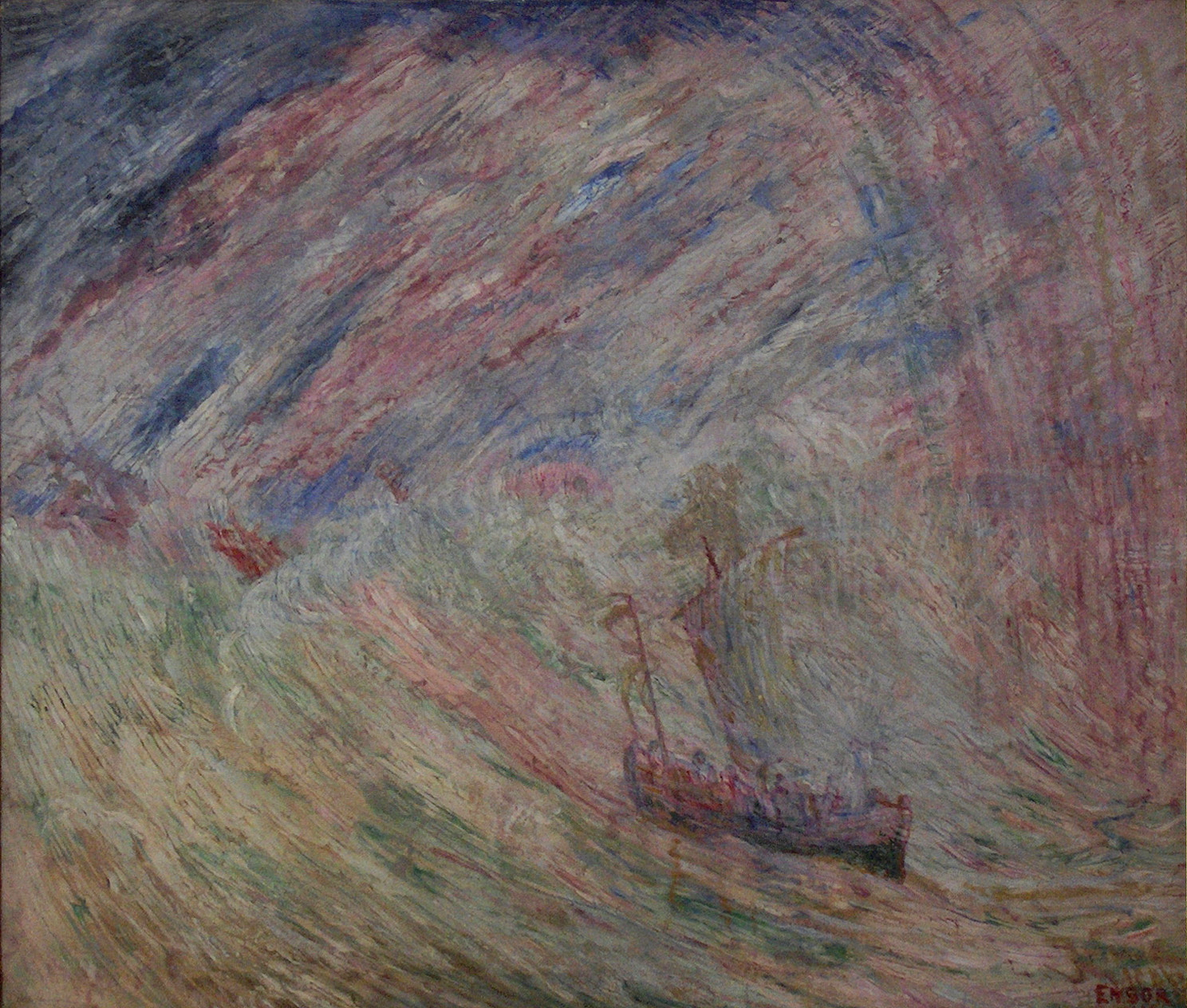
James Ensor 1891

== See also ==
- Chronology of Jesus
- Life of Jesus in the New Testament
- Ministry of Jesus
- Parables of Jesus
- Luke 8
