= Hendrik Jan Schimmel =

Dutch poet, novelist and financier

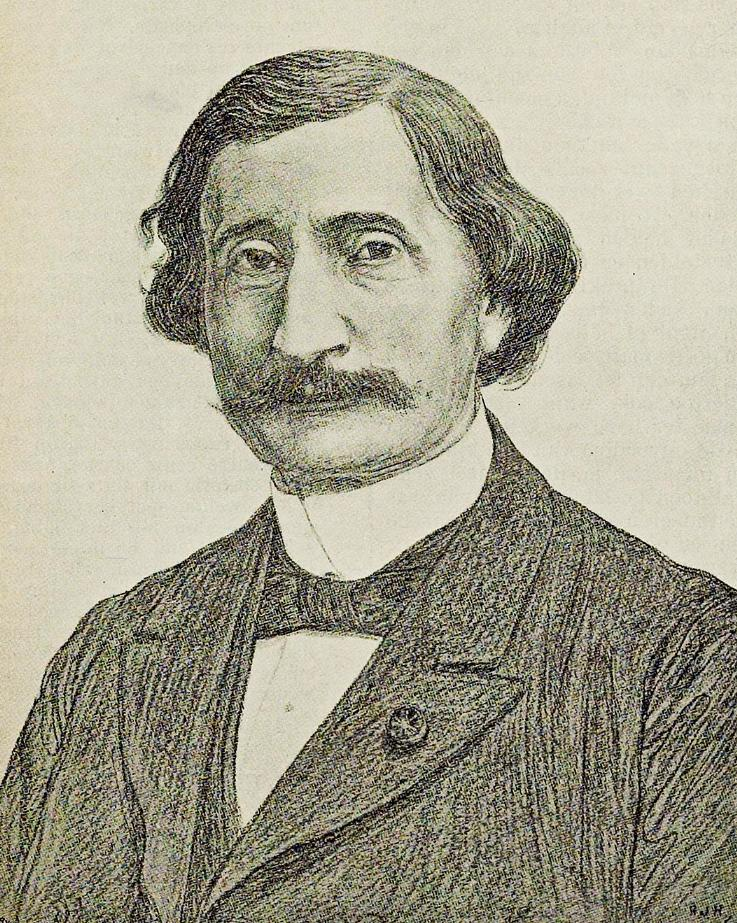
H.J. Schimmel by Hendrik Haverman

Hendrik Jan Schimmel (June 30, 1823 – November 14, 1906), Dutch poet, novelist and financier, was born at 's-Graveland, in the province of North Holland, where his father was a notary and the burgomaster.

== Biography ==
From 1836 to 1842, Schimmel served in his father's office, and upon his death, he worked in the office of the agent of the Dutch Treasury in Amsterdam, and in 1849, he took a post with the Dutch Trading Company there. In 1863, he became a director of the Amsterdam Credit Association. His first volume of poems appeared in 1852; but his literary position was made as a writer of historical dramas in blank verse and one of the regenerators of the Dutch stage. His finest production was Struensee (1868), which was preceded by Napoleon Bonaparte (1851) and Juffrouw Serklaas ("Mrs Serklaas," 1857).

Among his other dramatic works were Joan Woutersz (a drama, 1847), Twee Tudors ("Two Tudors," 1847), Gondelbald (1848), Schuld en boete ("Guilt and Retribution," a drama, 1852), Het Kind van Staat ("The State Child," a dramatic fragment, 1859); Zege na strijd ("Struggle and Triumph," a drama, 1878). Schimmel's renderings of Casimir de la Vigne's Louis XI., Geibel's Sophonisbe, and Ponsard's Lucréce are also still acted in the Netherlands.

His novels are distinguished by their vigorous style and able characterization. The earlier, better-known ones betray the writer's English proclivities. The plots of Mary Hollis (1860, 3 vols, English translation, London 1872, under the title of Mary Hollis, a Romance of the Days of Charles II and William, Prince of Orange, 3 vols) and of Mylady Carlisle (1864, 4 vols) are laid in England, whereas those of his Sinjeur Semeyns (1875, 3 vols), a powerful picture of the terrible year 1672, and of De kapitein van de lijfgarde (1888, 3 vols, English adaptation, 1896, under the title of The Lifeguardsman, 1 vol.), a continuation of Master Semeyns, are almost entirely centred in Holland.

He had many points of style and manner in common with Madame Bosboom-Toussaint, though both remained highly original in their treatment. Both finally reverted to essentially national subjects. To the earlier romances of Schimmel belong: Bonaparte en zijn tijd ("Bonaparte and his Time," 1853), De eerste dag eens nieuwen levens ("The First Day of a New Life," 2 vols, 1855), Sproken en vertellingen ("Legends and Tales," 1855), Een Haagsche joffer ("A Hague Damsel," 1857), De Vooravond der revolutie ("The Eve of the Revolution," 1866).

Schimmel was an early collaborator of Potgieter on the De Gids staff. His dramatic works appeared in a collected edition in 1885–1886 at Amsterdam (3 vols), followed by a complete and popular issue of his novels (Schiedam, 1892). He spent his last years in work on spiritualistic research and died at Bussum in 1906.
