= Oosterkerk, Amsterdam =

Church building in Amsterdam

Coordinates: 52°22′11.63″N 4°55′9.82″E

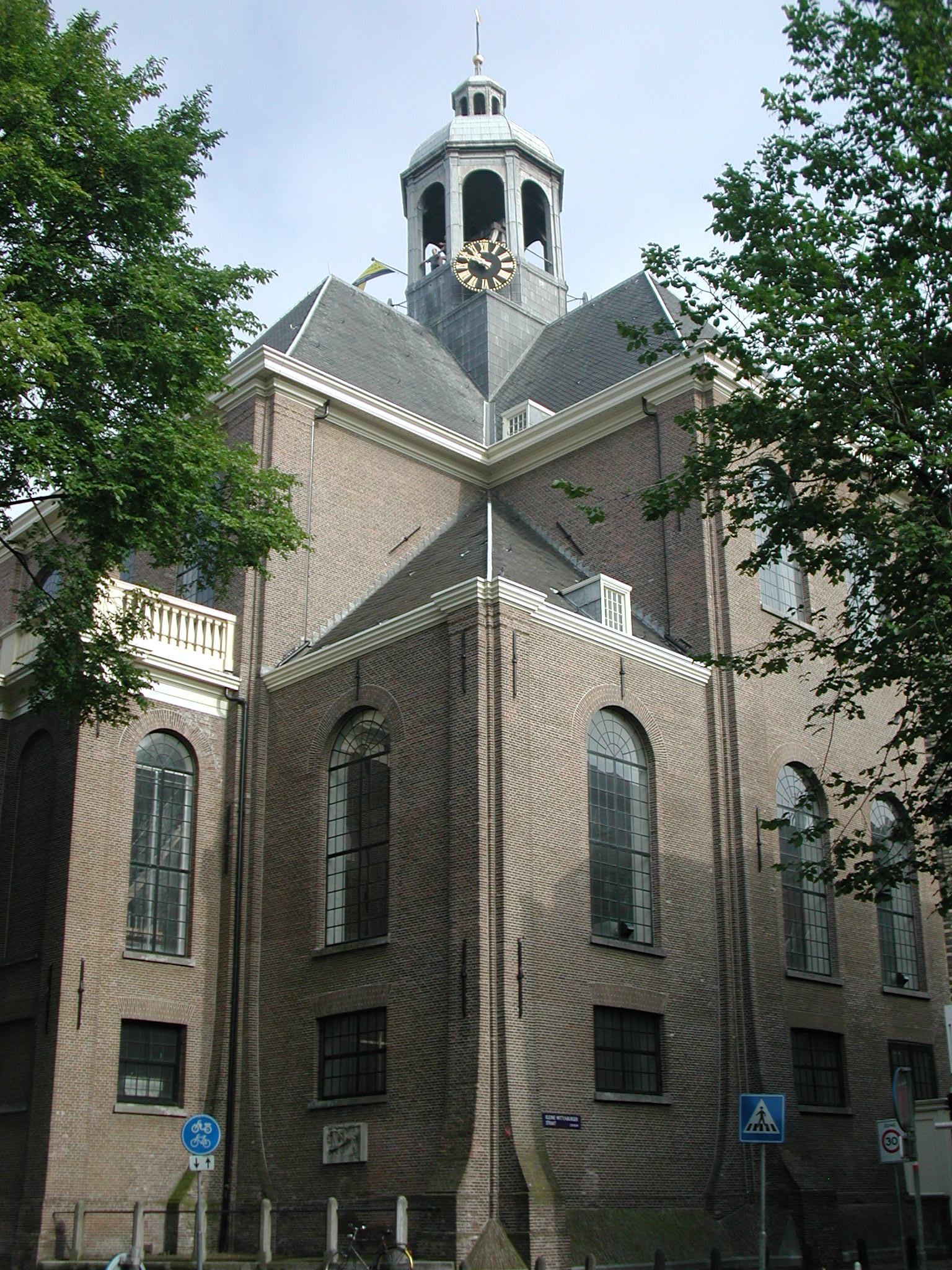
The Oosterkerk

The Oosterkerk ("eastern church") is a 17th-Century Dutch Reformed church in Amsterdam, The Netherlands.

The Oosterkerk was built in the period 1669-1671 by architect Daniël Stalpaert and completed by Adriaan Dortsman. The church bells were cast by Pieter Hemony.

The church has not been used for church services since 1962, and fell into decay since then. It was restored in the 1980s.

The layout of the church is in the shape of a Greek cross in which the space between the arms has been partially filled by lower volumes. On the canal side is the main entrance, the elevation of which is supported by a balustrade.

Some 500 people were buried in the church, including Adriaan Dortsman.
