= Trompenburgh =

17th-century manor house in 's-Graveland, Netherlands

Coordinates: 52°13′55″N 5°07′23″E

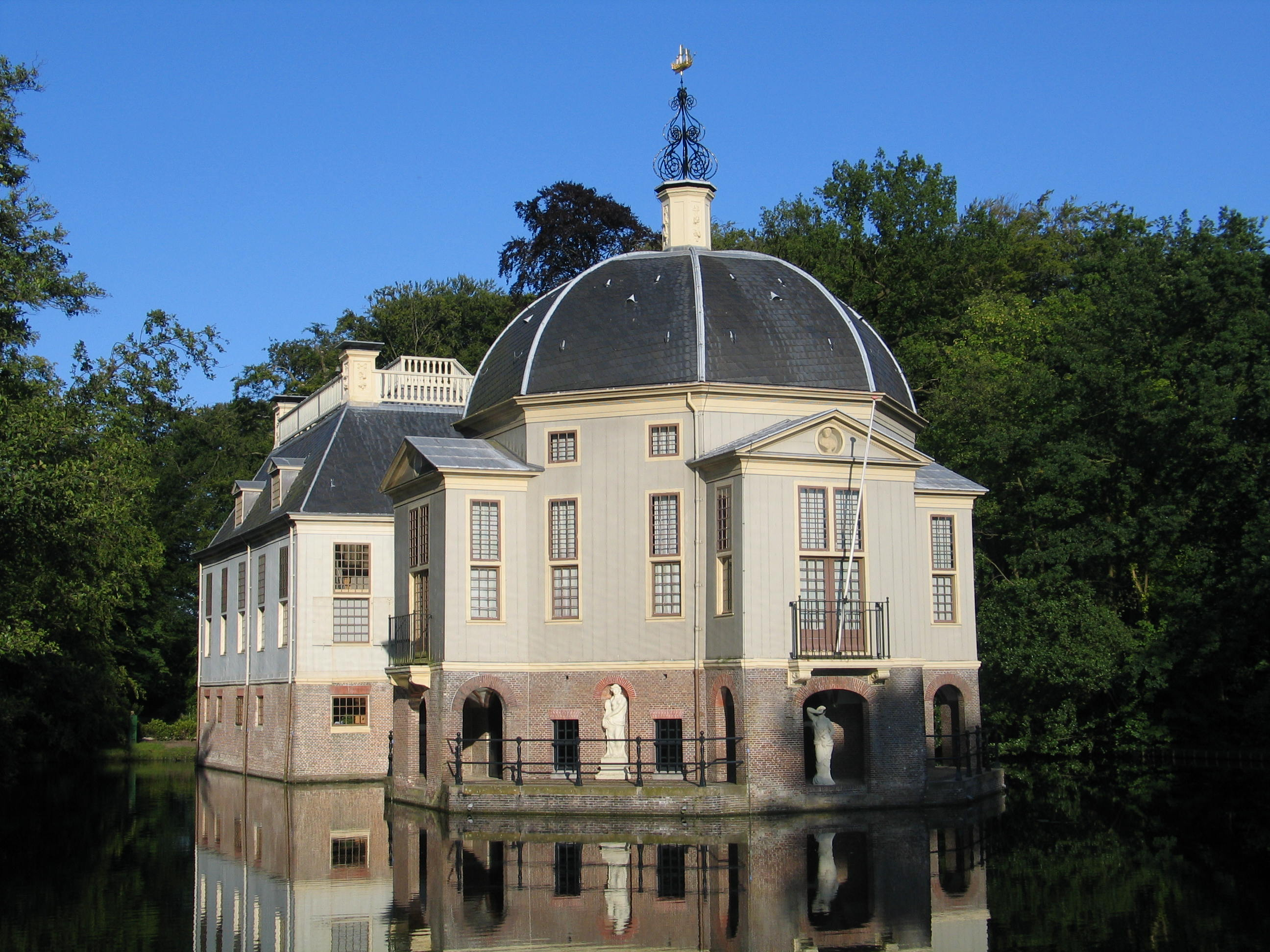
Trompenburgh

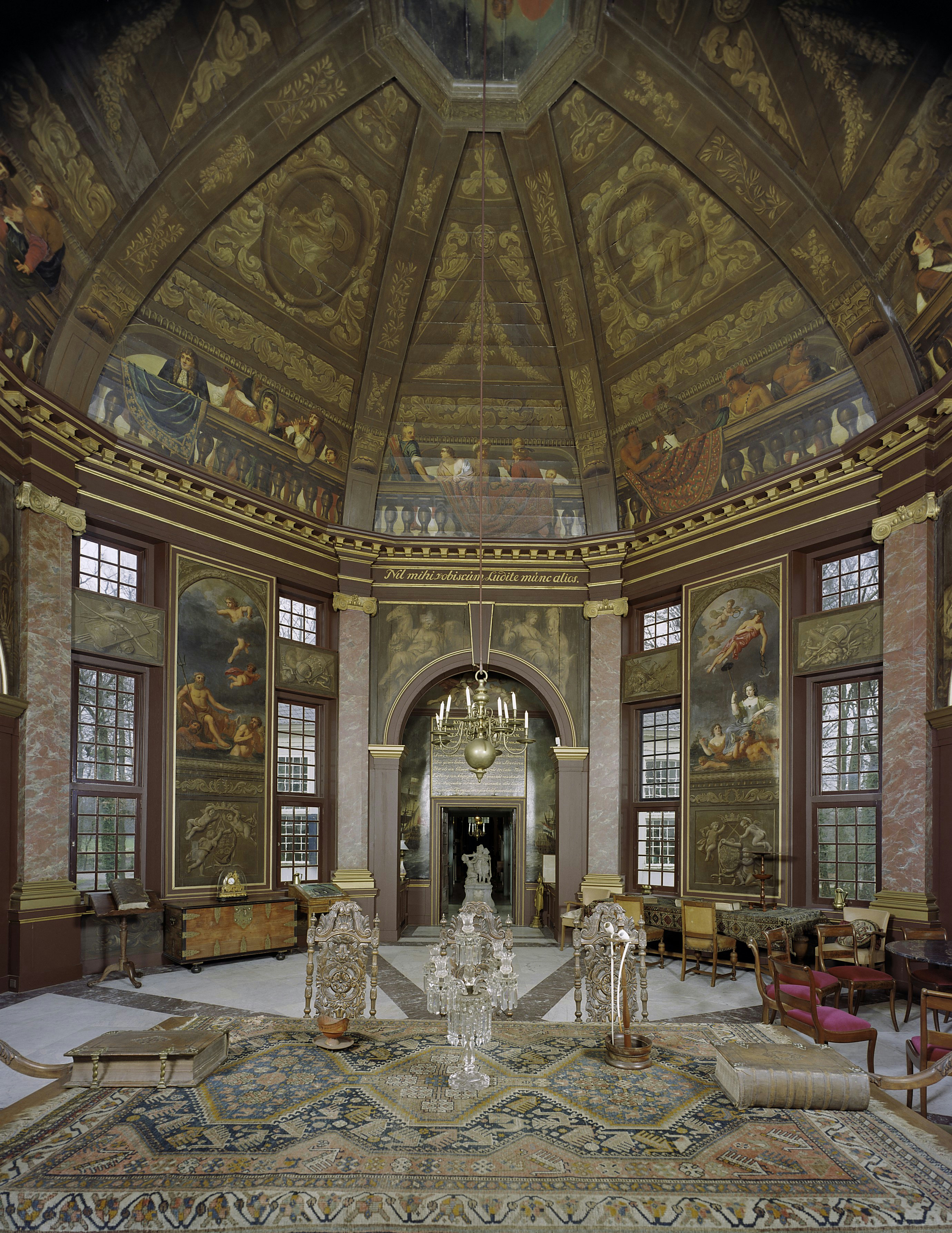
Interior of Trompenburgh

Trompenburgh is a 17th-century manor house in 's-Graveland, designed by Daniël Stalpaert in Dutch Baroque style was built for Admiral Cornelis Tromp, one of the naval heroes of the Dutch Republic. The mansion is almost entirely surrounded by water and was built to resemble a ship, even with decks and railings.

Before the current mansion was built, the plot was owned by Andries Bicker and his sister Dieuwertje (1584-1641). Joan van Hellemondt (1616-1665), her son, built a mansion on the estate, called De Hooge Dreuvik, which dates back to 1654. Through inheritance the mansion came into the possession of his widow, Margaretha van Raephorst (1625-1690). She remarried her neighbor Cornelis Tromp in January 1667. The couple redecorated the mansion considerably but it was looted and burned by the French army in February 1673, after the year of disaster.

It was rebuilt from 1675 to 1684 by Tromp, who called it Sylisburg, which refers to the Danish title given to him, count of Sölvesborg in 1676. (In May 1676 Tromp became commander-in-chief of the Danish fleet.) After his death in 1691 the mansion was called Trompenburgh. Around 1720, Jacob Roeters came into possession of the estate, etc.
