= Cornelis Tromp =

Dutch naval officer

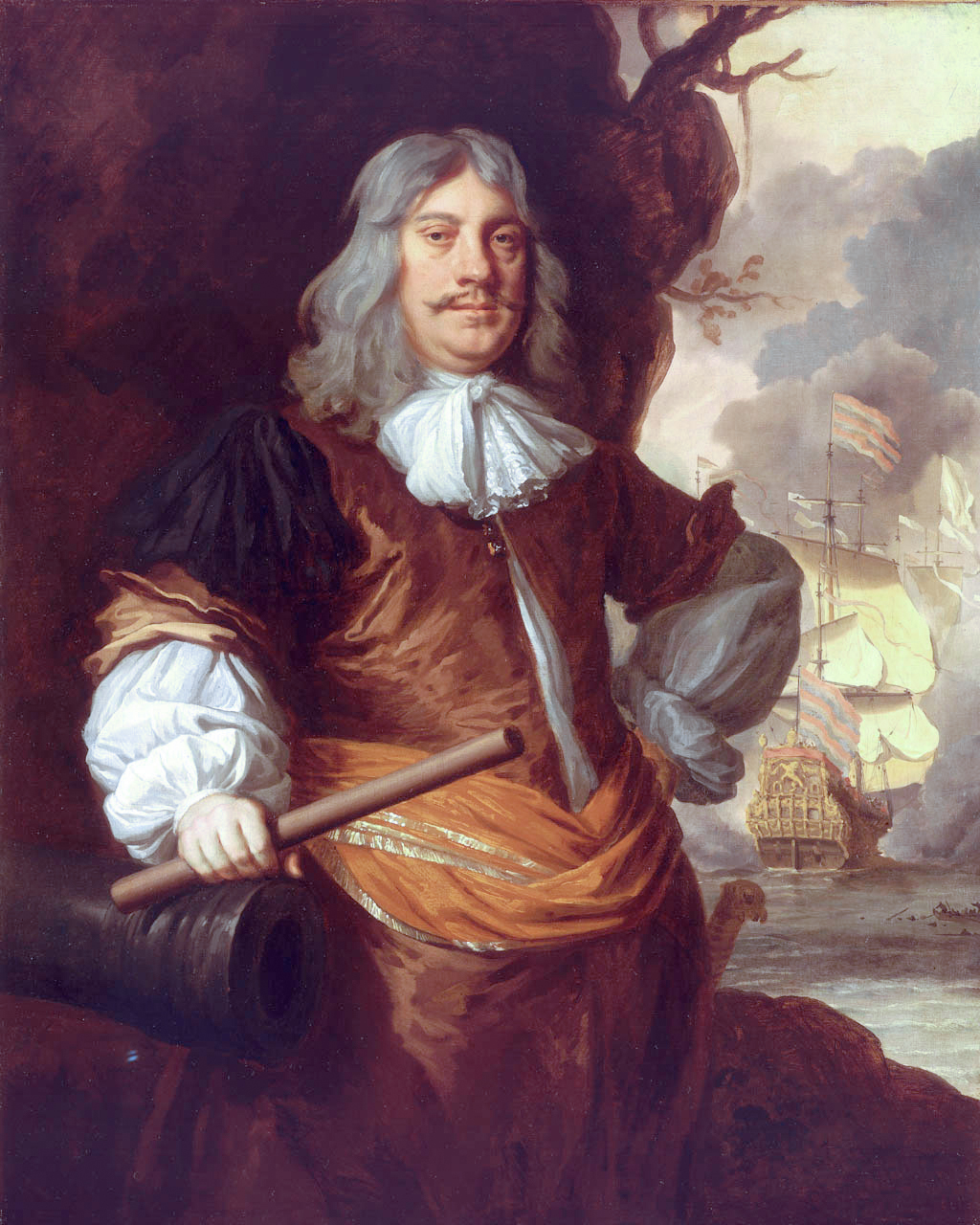
- Tromp by Peter Lely
- Born: Cornelis Maartenszoon Tromp; 9 September 1629; Rotterdam, Dutch Republic
- Died: 29 May 1691 (aged 61); Amsterdam, Dutch Republic
- Burial place: Oude Kerk, Delft
- Relatives: Maarten Tromp (father)
- Military career
- Allegiance: Dutch Republic; Denmark–Norway (1676-1678)
- Branch: Admiralty of Zeeland; Admiralty of Amsterdam; Royal Danish-Norwegian Navy
- Service years: 1643–1691
- Rank: Lieutenant-general-admiral (Dutch republic); General-admiral (Denmark-Norway)
- Wars: First Anglo-Dutch War; Battle of Elba; Battle of Leghorn; Second Northern War; Siege of Danzig; Second Anglo-Dutch War; Battle of Lowestoft; Four Days' Battle; St. James's Day Battle; Franco-Dutch War; First Battle of Schooneveld; Second Battle of Schooneveld; Battle of Texel; Capture of Noirmoutier; Battle of Öland; Landing at Ystad; Invasion of Rügen
- Awards: Order of the Elephant

Cornelis Maartenszoon Tromp, Count of Sølvesborg (9 September 1629 – 29 May 1691) was a Dutch naval officer who served as lieutenant-admiral general in the Dutch Navy, and briefly as a general admiral in the Royal Danish-Norwegian Navy. Tromp is one of the most celebrated and controversial figures in Dutch naval history due to his actions in the Anglo-Dutch Wars and the Scanian War. His father was the renowned Lieutenant Admiral Maarten Tromp.

== Early life ==
Cornelis Maartenszoon Tromp was born on 9 September 1629, in Rotterdam, in the historically dominant county of Holland. He was the second son of Maarten Tromp and Dina Cornelisdochter de Haas. His name Maartenszoon, sometimes abbreviated to Maartensz, is a patronymic. He had two full brothers, Harper and Johan.

In 1633, when he was only four years old, his mother died. His father remarried in 1634, and again in 1640. The two marriages brought Tromp four half brothers and five half sisters. His father had made career as an officer for the Admiralty of the Maze. After a conflict with Lieutenant Admiral Philips van Dorp in 1634, Maarten Tromp left the fleet starting to work as a deacon. After Van Dorp was removed from his position in 1637, his father became lieutenant admiral and supreme commander of the Dutch Navy.

In 1642, Tromp was sent to Harfleur, France, to learn to speak French from a Calvinist preacher.

== Early navy career ==
On 1 September 1643, he joined his father on his flagship the Aemilia. In September 1645, he was appointed as lieutenant and commanded a small squadron charged to pursue the Barbary pirates. On 22 August 1649, he was made a full captain. He served in the First Anglo-Dutch War, fighting in the battle of Leghorn, but was not given command of the Mediterranean fleet after the death of Johan van Galen, only being promoted to rear admiral with the Admiralty of de Maze on 11 November 1653, after the death of his beloved father, Maarten.

In 1656, he participated in the relief of Gdańsk. In 1658, it was discovered he had used his ships to trade in luxury goods; as a result he was fined and not allowed to have an active command until 1662. Just before the Second Anglo-Dutch War, he was promoted to vice admiral on 29 January 1665; at the battle of Lowestoft, he prevented total catastrophe by taking over fleet command to allow the escape of the larger part of the fleet.

== Lieutenant admiral ==
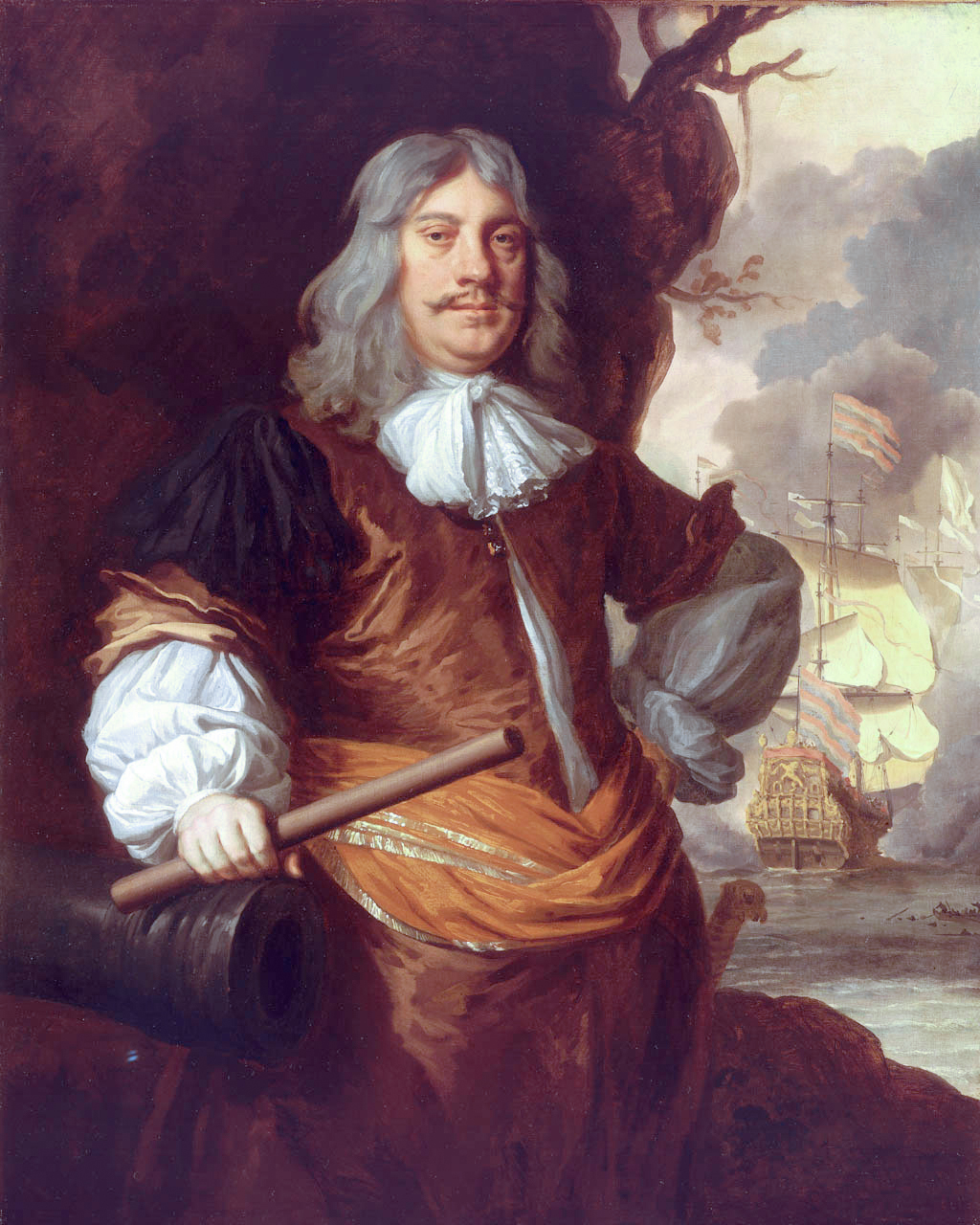
Portrait by Peter Lely

Gaining sudden popularity, he was temporarily given supreme command as lieutenant admiral of the confederate fleet on 23 July 1665, but had to give up this function (but not rank) the next month in favour of Lieutenant Admiral Michiel de Ruyter; he fought, having been transferred to the Admiralty of Amsterdam on 6 February 1666, under the latter in the Four Days Battle and the St. James's Day Battle.

As this failure off Nieuwpoort in August 1666 was imputed to him by De Ruyter, he was dismissed, at the same time, being under the suspicion of plotting to overthrow the government, but he was reinstated in April 1673 by William of Orange, after the Orangists seized power, to fight against the French and English navies in the Third Anglo-Dutch War. There he participated in the last three fleet actions under Lieutenant-Admiral-General Michiel de Ruyter, distinguishing himself in the double battle of Schooneveld and the battle of Texel in August 1673, fighting out an epic duel with his personal enemy Edward Spragge, who drowned. During this war, his flagship was the Gouden Leeuw, of 82 cannons.

In 1674 a Dutch fleet under Tromp operated along the French coast. He directed a landing on 27 June on the island of Belle Île, on the coast of Brittany, and captured its coastal bulwarks. The Dutch however left the island again after 2 days, because the 3,000 French defenders had taken refuge in the island's strong fortress and a siege would have taken too long. A few days later, on 4 July, the island of Noirmoutier was attacked. After a short struggle, which left more than a hundred Dutch men out of action, the French retreated to Poitou, leaving the island, with its castle, coastal batteries, more than 30 pieces of artillery and several ships, in the hands of the Dutch. For nearly three weeks, the Dutch flag flew from the walls of the French stronghold and the Dutch fleet captured many French ships in the meantime. The whole region from Brest to Bayonne was in turmoil, and several strong French forces gathered there to prevent the Dutch from landing. On 23 July the island of Noirmoutier was however abandoned after the Dutch blew up the castle and demolished the coastal batteries. The French coast was kept in fear for some time, but after visiting the Mediterranean Sea, Tromp's fleet returned to Holland at the end of 1674.

He was closely involved in the murder of Johan de Witt and Cornelis de Witt in 1672. In 1675, he visited England and was created an English baronet and a Dutch erfridder by Charles II of England, but he refused an honorary doctorate when visiting Oxford.

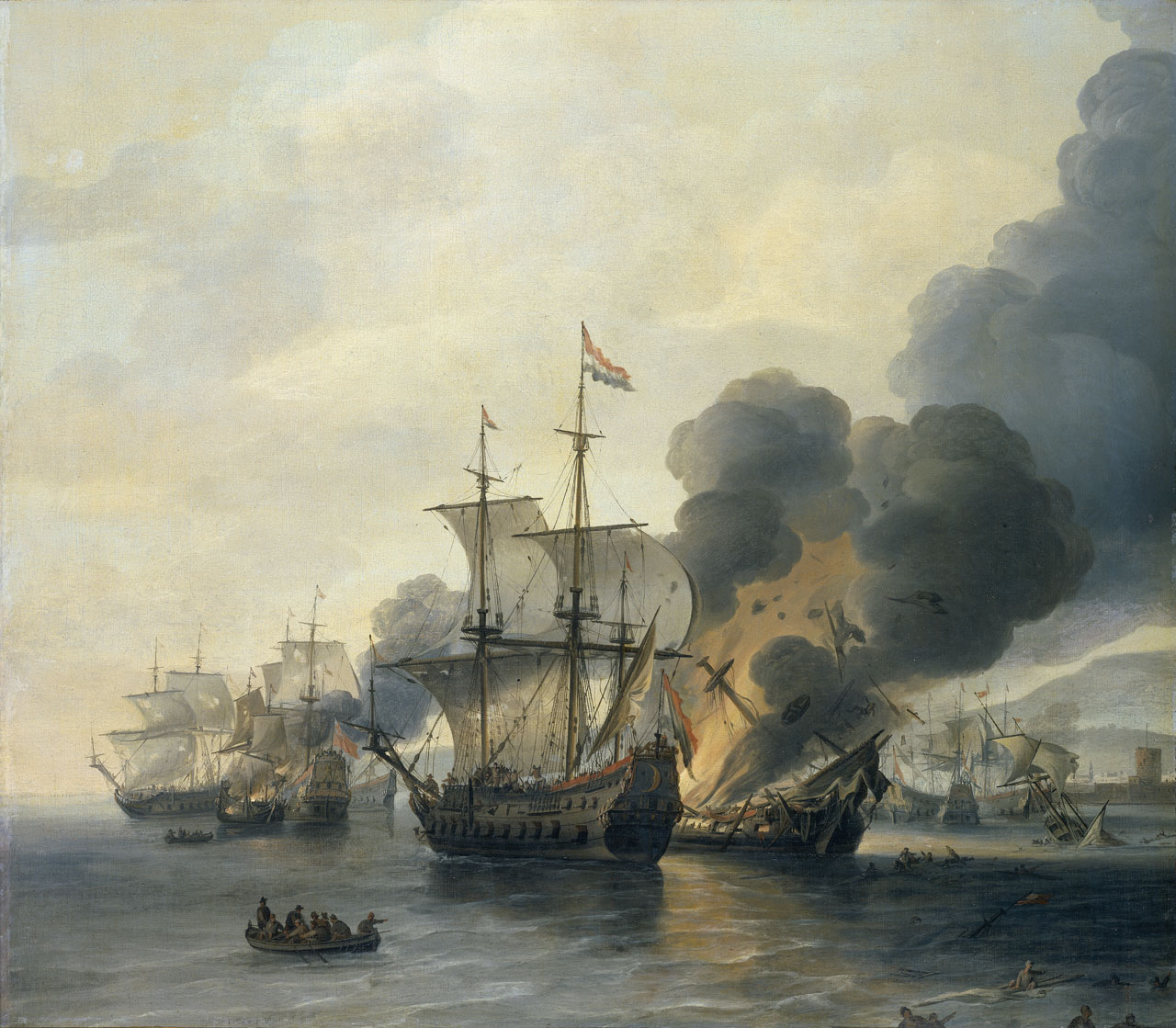
The battle of Leghorn in 1653

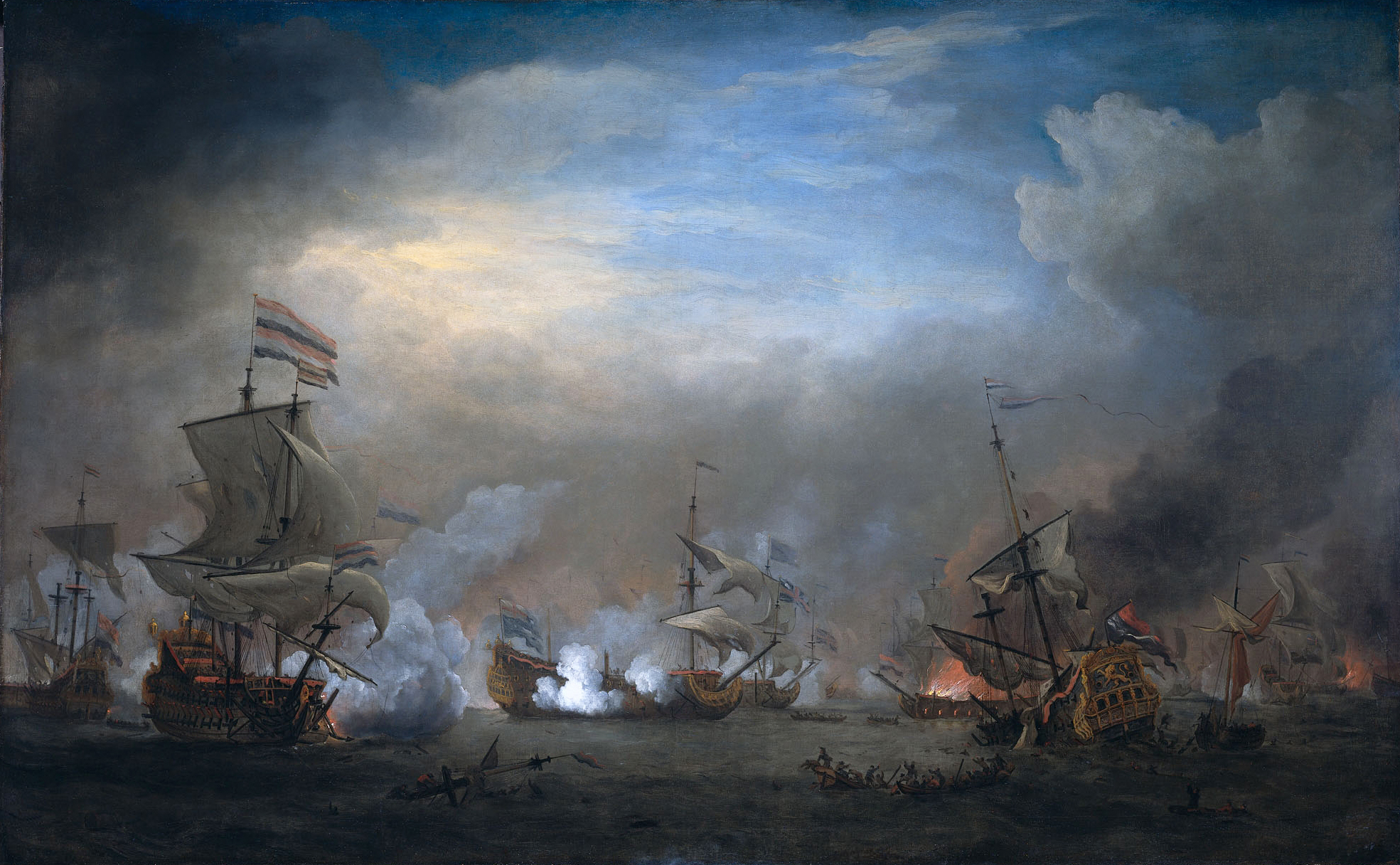
The battle of Texel in 1673

== Danish-Norwegian Navy and Scanian War ==
On 8 May 1676, he became admiral general of the Danish-Norwegian Navy and Knight in the Order of the Elephant; in 1677, Count of Sølvesborg – then a Danish nobility title. During the Scanian War he defeated the Swedish navy in the Battle of Öland. Tromp led the successful Landing at Ystad in Scania in June 1677, where there was a minor but still notable fighting before the Swedes withdrew and left the city in Danish hands. Tromp summoned all the local noblemen of Danish origin to his presence in order to promise they would stay still on their estates and not cause any trouble. He then took a two-week holiday at Baron Jörgen Krabbe's Castle Krogholm (now Krageholm), just north of Aletophilus (Olluf Rosencrantz?) Ystad. During this period Tromp also licensed the local Danish bailiffs to recruit as many males as possible for the local Danish militias and sheriffs' teams. Tromp is mentioned in the local court registers for having licensed a Sheriff by the name of Bendix Clausen to recruit men in six different districts (hundreds) and there was some fierce fighting between these troops and the Swedes. Clausen and his men were branded as criminal 'snapphanar' by the Swedes. For that reason Tromp also played a role for the snapphanar, who were in essence the local resistance and Danish para-military troops.

== Lieutenant-admiral general ==
On 6 February 1679, he became lieutenant-admiral general of the Republic but never fought in that capacity, having become a liability to the new regime of William III. He died in Amsterdam in 1691, his mind broken by alcohol abuse and remorse, still officially commander of the Dutch fleet, after having been for a period replaced by Cornelis Evertsen the Youngest.

== Character ==
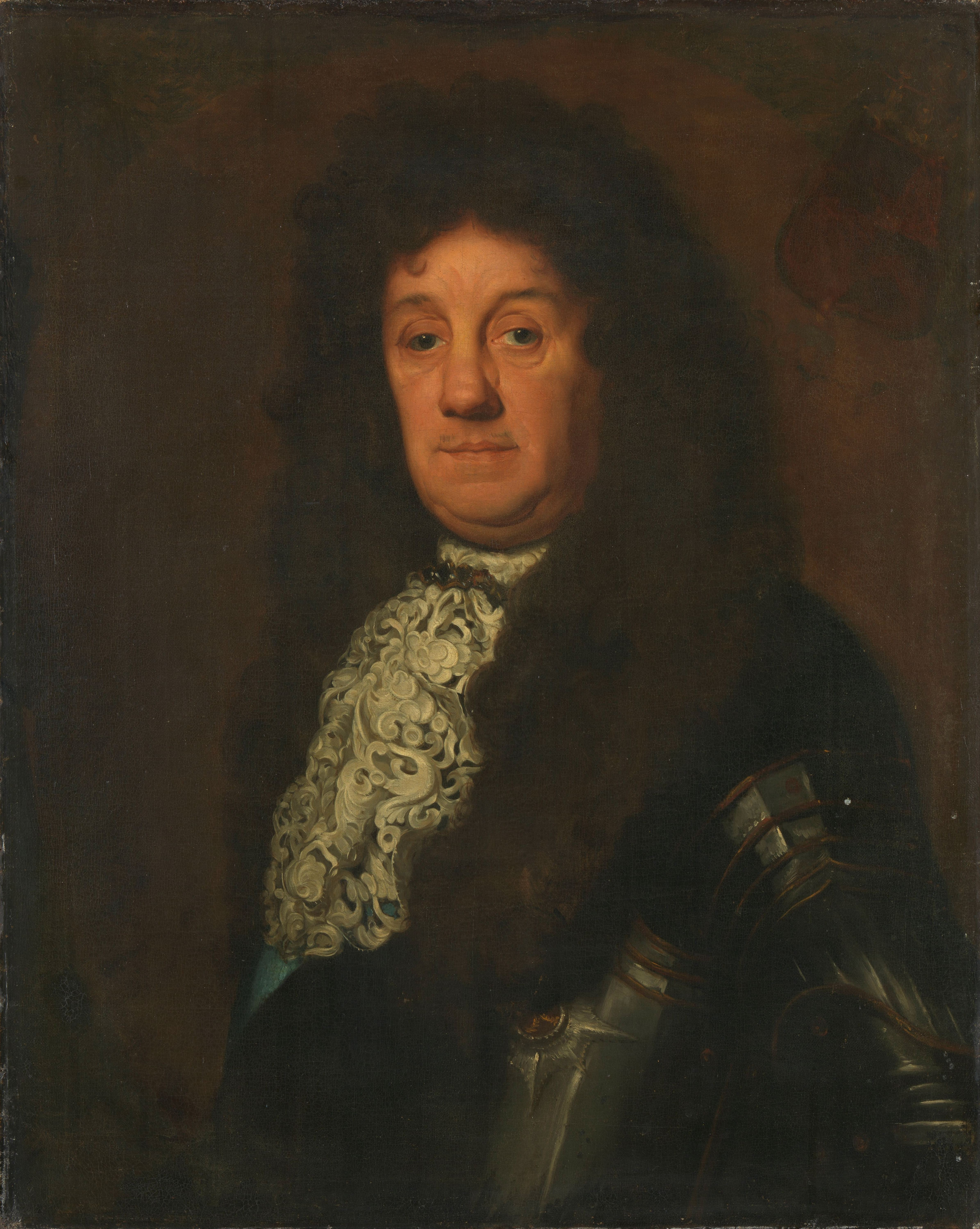
Tromp at a later age, painted by David van der Plas

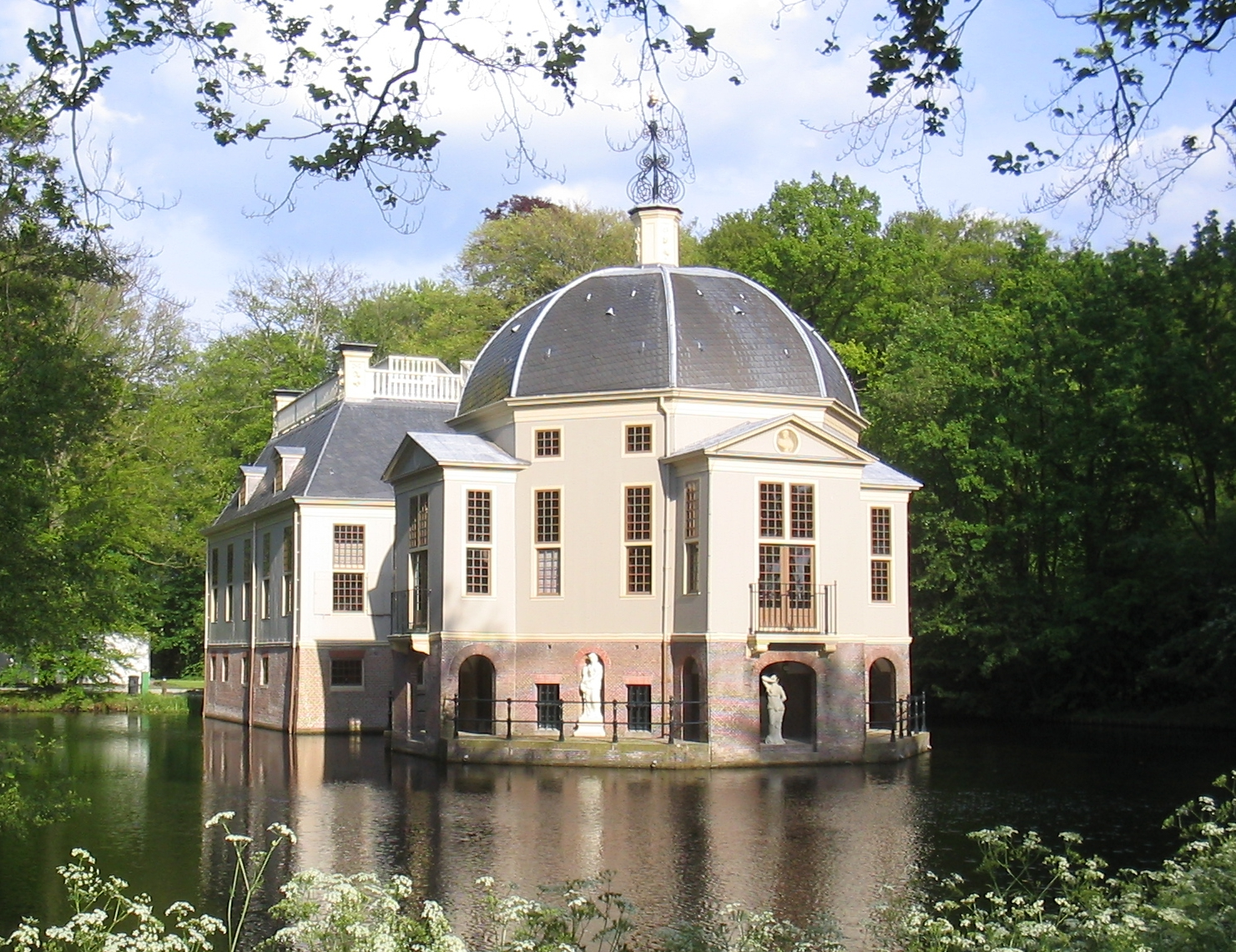
Trompenburgh

Tromp was a very aggressive squadron commander who personally relished the fight, preferring the direct attack having the weather gage over line-of-battle tactics. As a result, he had to change ships often: four times at the Four Days' Battle, three times at Schooneveld and two times at Texel. He was popular with his crews, despite the danger he put them in, because of his easy-going manners and his supporting the cause of the House of Orange against the States regime of Johan de Witt. However, he often treated his fellow officers with contempt, both his equals and superiors.

Tromp is infamous for his insubordination, although the two examples most often mentioned in this context, not following De Ruyter on the second day of the Four Days' Battle and chasing the English rear in the St James's Day Fight, seem to have been honest mistakes. He was very jealous of De Ruyter but generally treated him with respect, though he considered him too common. Tromp tried to imitate the lifestyle of the nobility, marrying a rich elderly widow, Margaretha van Raephorst, in 1667. He had no children. At home, without fighting to distract him, Cornelis, or Kees as he was normally called, grew quickly bored and indolent. He had the reputation of being a heavy drinker, so much so that many inns at the time were named after him.

Tromp was a vain man, having an extremely high opinion of himself, which he never hesitated in sharing with others. He felt that, son of a famous father, he had a natural right to the position of naval hero. During his life he posed as a sitter for at least 22 paintings, a record for the 17th century, many by top artists such as Ferdinand Bol. His art possessions were displayed in his estate, that long after his death was called 'Trompenburgh', the manor house built in the form of a warship.

As his wider family was among the most fanatical supporters of Orange, he participated in most of their schemes, especially those of his brother-in-law Johan Kievit, a shrewd and unscrupulous intriguer. Tromp however had no great enthusiasm for subtle plotting. Later in life he may have come to regret many of his actions. He died in great mental anguish, convinced he would go to hell, although there is no reliable report saying why.

== Legacy ==
The Dutch Ministry of Defence names Maarten Tromp and Cornelis Tromp as naval heroes. Since 1777, nine navy ships have been named Tromp in honour of them, most recently the frigate HNLMS Tromp.

== Bibliography ==
- Atkinson, Christopher Thomas (1899). Letters and papers relating to the First Dutch War, 1652-1654. Vol. IV. London: Navy Records Society.
- Atkinson, Christopher Thomas (1899). Letters and papers relating to the First Dutch War, 1652-1654. Vol. V. London: Navy Records Society.
- Campbell, John (1812). Lives of the British admirals : containing an accurate naval history from the earliest periods. Vol. III. London: C.J. Barrington.
- Campbell, John (1813). Naval history of Great Britain, including the history and lives of the British admirals. Vol. II. London: J. Stockdale.
- Chisholm, Hugh, ed. (1911). "Tromp s.v. 2. Cornelius Van Tromp" . Encyclopædia Britannica. Vol. 27 (11th ed.). Cambridge University Press. p. 305.
- Prud'homme van Reine, R. (2001). Schittering en schandaal (in Dutch). Amsterdam: De Arbeiderspers. ISBN 978-9-02953-5724.
- Rideal, Rebecca (2016). 1666 : plague, war and hellfire. London: John Murray, publisher. ISBN 978-1-47362-3552.
- Van Lennep, Jacob (1880). De geschiedenis van Nederland, aan het Nederlandsche Volk verteld [The history of the Netherlands, told to the Dutch nation] (in Dutch). Leiden; z.j.
- Rommelse, Gijs (2006). The Second Anglo-Dutch War (1665-1667): Raison D'état, Mercantilism and Maritime Strife. Uitgeverij Verloren. ISBN 978-9-06550-9079.
- Thieme, J.F. (1848). "Krijgskundige beschouwingen over den oorlog van 1672-1678 in de Nederlanden" [Military reflections on the war of 1672-1678 in the Netherlands]. Nieuwe Spectator (in Dutch).

Baronetage of England
New creation	Baronet (of Holland); 1675–1691	Extinct
