= Daniël Stalpaert =

Dutch architect, painter, town carpenter, print artist and draftsman

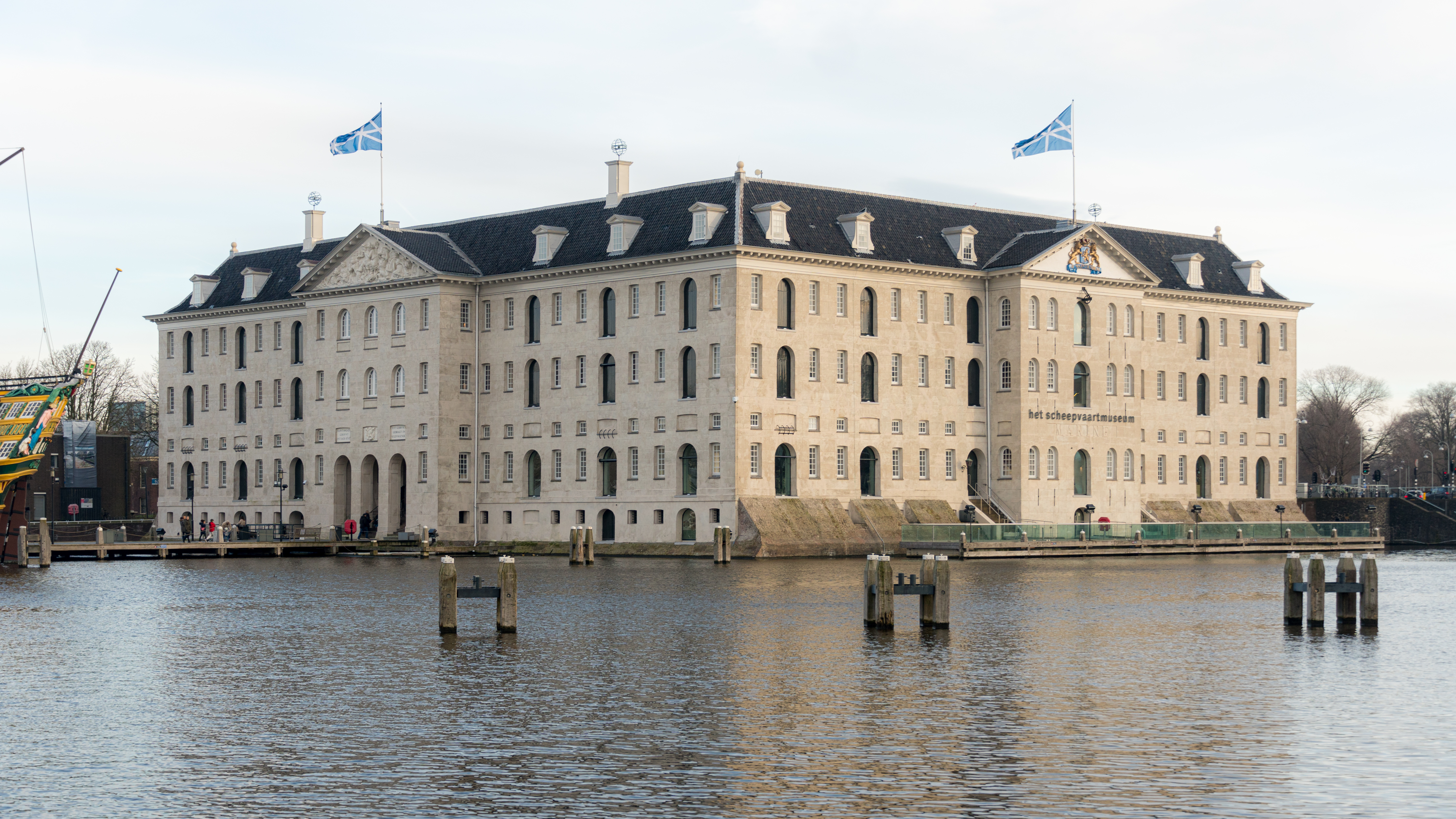
The Dutch Maritime Museum, 1656

Daniël Stalpaert or Daniel Stalpert (1615, in Amsterdam – buried 3 December 1676, in Amsterdam), was a Dutch architect, painter, town carpenter, print artist and draftsman. He was the first city architect in Amsterdam, a position that would not be filled again until 70 years after his death. He is mainly remembered for his contributions to the new town hall of Amsterdam, now the Royal Palace.

== Life ==
Stalpaert was born in Amsterdam as the son of Pieter Stalpaert and Maeyken de Walperghe. His father was a Flemish landscape painter who was born in Brussels and had emigrated with his parents to the Dutch Republic likely for religious reasons. His father had become a poorter (citizen) of Amsterdam in 1609. His mother was born in Antwerp and was his father's second wife.

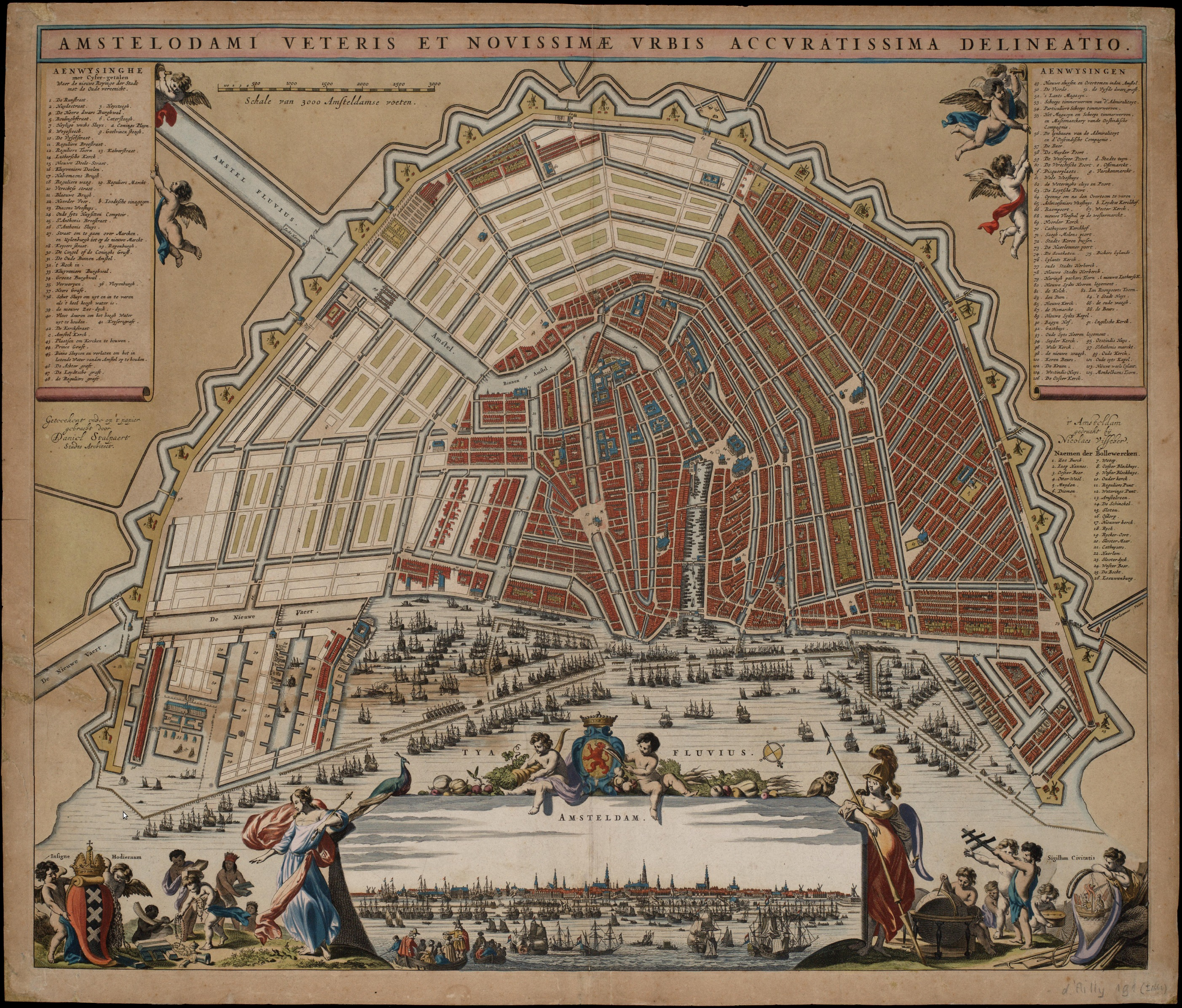
Map of Amsterdam with the New Enlargement designed by Stalpaert

He trained initially as a painter with his father. He announced his wedding with Margrieta Francen on 26 July 1639. The record of his wedding states that Daniël Stalpaert was then 24 years old and was a painter. The document further states that he was living with his mother and his uncle Abraham de Walperge on the Conninxgrach (now called the Singel). A daughter born from the marriage and his wife died the next year.

In 1645 he remarried. His second wife Machtelt Lodders was the widow of a timber merchant. This marriage would remain childless. His profession at the time of the wedding was recorded as broker, presumably in shares. He likely took over his wife's timber business.

== Architectural work ==
He was appointed city architect on 29 October 1648, with retroactive effect from 1 August. His annual salary was set at 1600 guilders, quite a considerable at that time. Why Stalpaert was suddenly appointed city architect by the Amsterdam city council is unclear as he likely had never designed a building before. It is believed that he got the post through the network of influential people he got to know through his timber business. It was part of his job to supervise the construction of the Town Hall on the Dam Square in Amsterdam, which started the year after his appointment as city architect. He cooperated with the city mason Willem de Keyser. The design of the Town Hall was made by Jacob van Campen. It is likely that Stalpaert made modifications to the original design of van Campen after the latter resigned from the project citing a conflict with his collaborators, which presumably included Stalpaert.

Stalpaert also played a major role in the 1663 urban expansion plan of Amsterdam city. Together with city surveyor Cornelis Danckerts, he designed the Fourth City Expansion, also known as 'New Enlargement'. In order to clarify his plans Stalpaert produced a number of copies of a 'demonstration map' of the new Amsterdam. It is one of the few documents by him that have survived.

He designed the city gates Leidsepoort, Weesperpoort and Utrechtsepoort in an austere neo-classical style. Stalpaert was responsible for 's Lands Zeemagazijn (1656), the building which currently houses the collection of the Dutch Maritime Museum. He also designed the Portuguese Synagogue, Oosterkerk in 1669–1671 and Trompenburgh.
