= Pieter Stalpaert =

Flemish painter

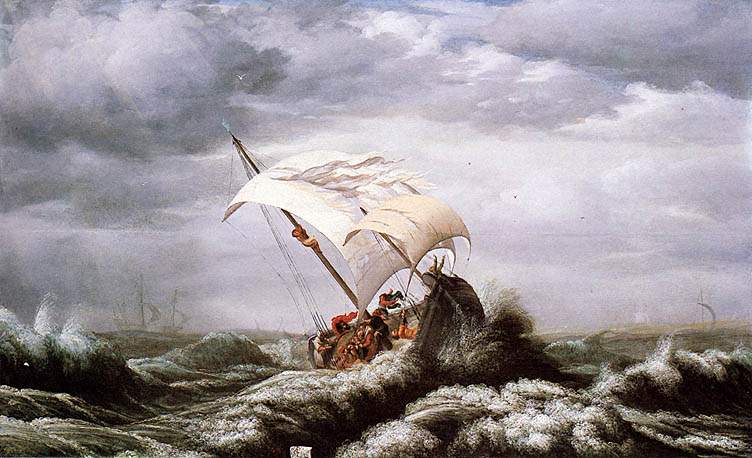
Christ calming the storm

Pieter Stalpaert or Peeter Stalpaert (1572 in Brussels – before 1639 in Amsterdam) was a Flemish painter who was active in the Dutch Republic. He is known for his landscape and marine paintings.

== Life ==
Stalpaert was born in Brussels as the son of Jeremyas who was a tapestry worker. The family was likely of the Protestant conviction and left the Southern Netherlands after it was reconquered by the Spanish in 1585. They settled in 1588 in Delft. It is not clear with whom Pieter trained. He worked in Dordrecht from 1597 to 1598. From 1598 he was in Amsterdam where he married on 28 March 1599 Beyken de Hertoge from Antwerp. At the time of his wedding he declared to have lived in Amsterdam for a year. They lived in the new area of town near the Korsgenspoort. On 13 November 1603, their son Johannes Jeremyas was baptized in the Old Church (Oude Kerk) in Amsterdam.

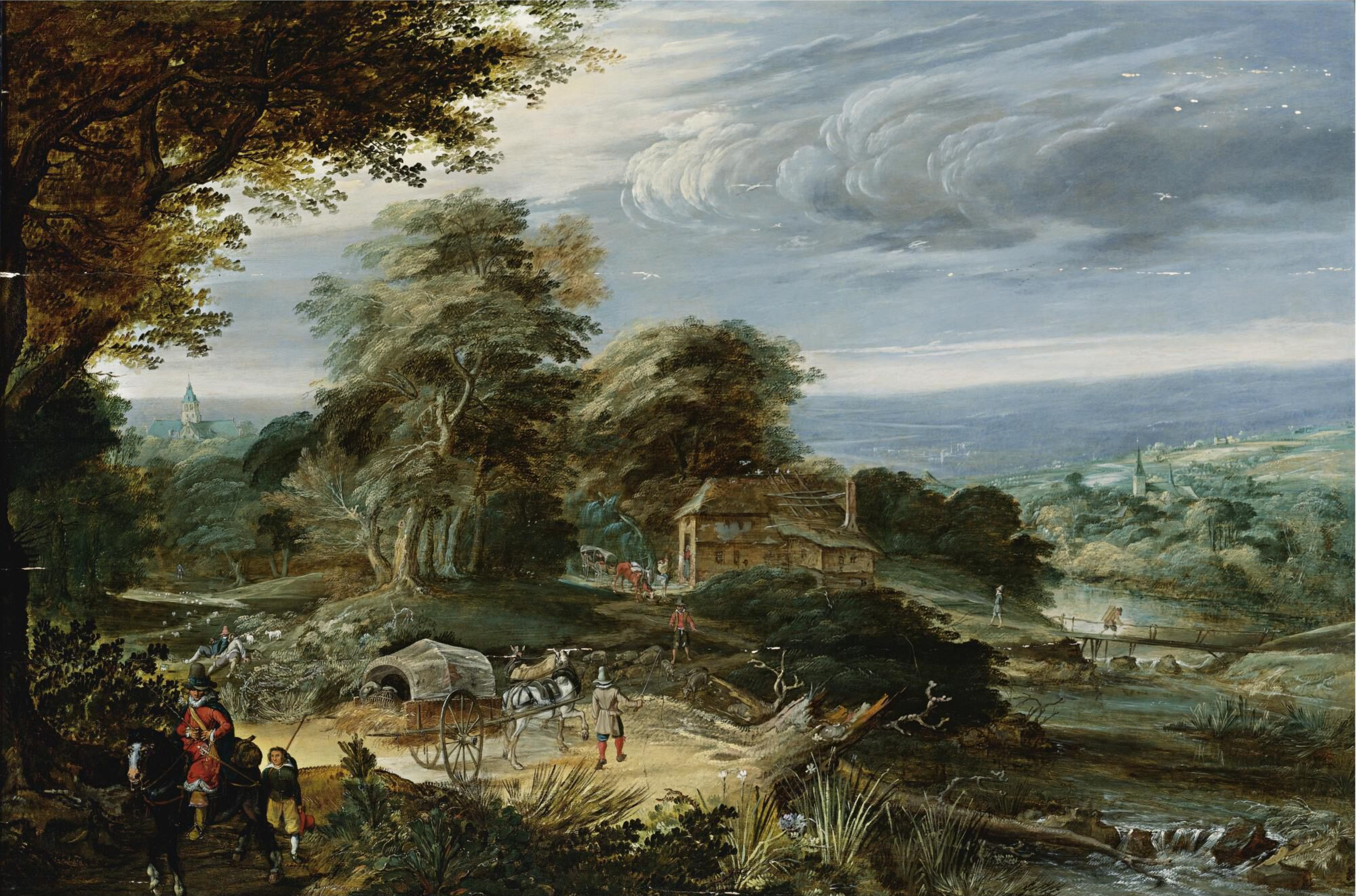
Extensive landscape with travelers on a path by a river, a cottage beyond

In 1609 he became a poorter (citizen) of Amsterdam. After the death of his first wife, he married a second time on 9 April 1611. His second wife Maeyken de Walperghe was, like has first one, originally from Antwerp. Five children were born in quick succession from the union. The third child Daniël, born around 1615, became the city architect of Amsterdam in 1648. A document drawn up on the date of his wedding on 26 July 1639 states that Daniël Stalpaert was 24 years old at that time and was also a painter. The document further states he was then living with his mother and his uncle Abraham de Walperge on the Conninxgrach (now called the Singel). This indicates that Pieter had most likely died before the date of the wedding of his son.

Pieter worked in Amsterdam where he died some time between 1635 (the date of his last known dated painting) and 26 July 1639 (the date of his son's wedding).

== Work ==
Stalpaert is known for his hilly and wooded landscapes with staffage and marine paintings. He also painted winter landscapes. Of the small number of his works that have been located, only a few are signed or dated.

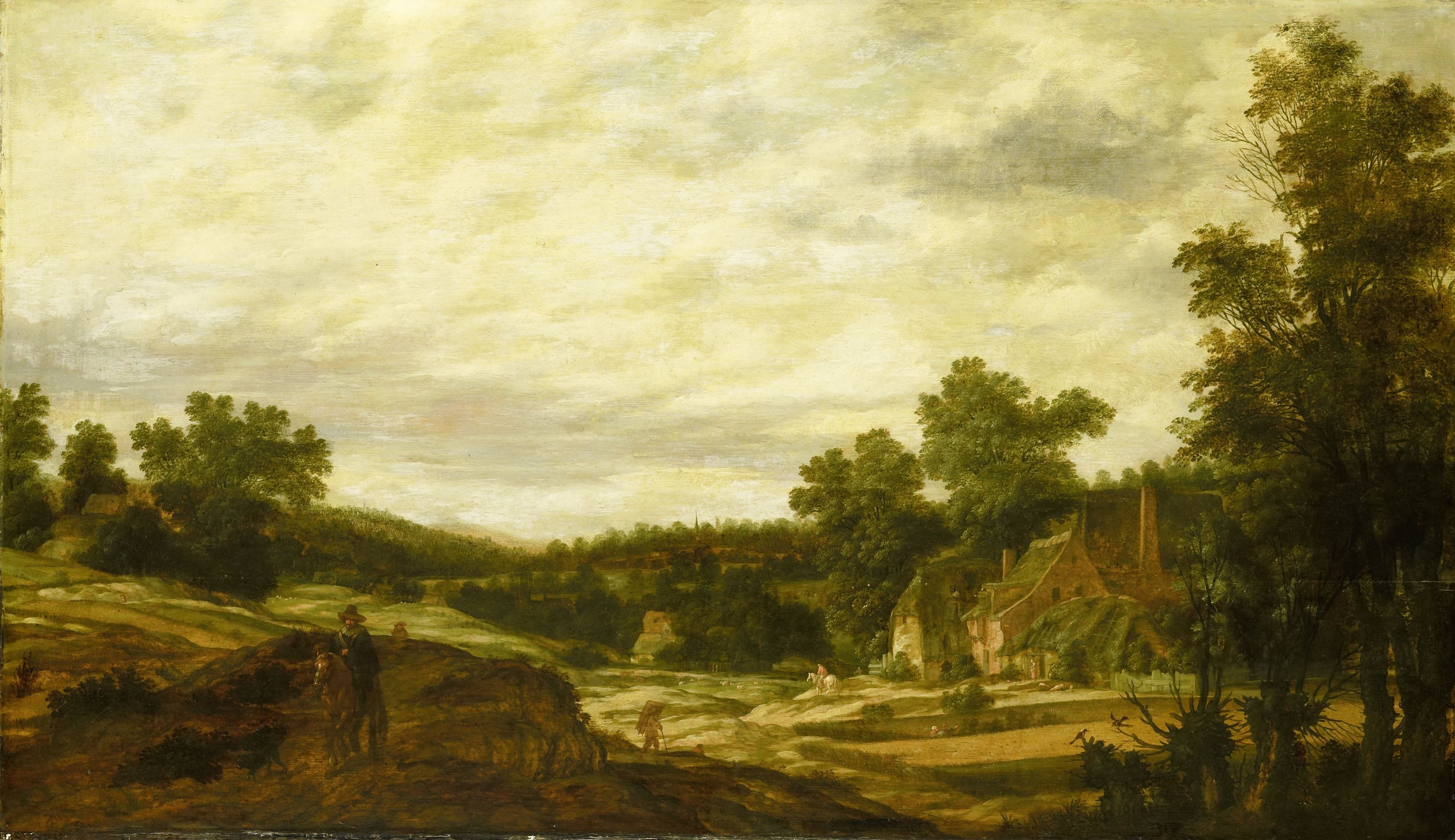
Hilly landscape

His work stands in the tradition of 17th-century Flemish landscape painting, as practiced by other Flemish artists who had emigrated to the Dutch Republic such as Hans Bol, Gillis d'Hondecoeter and Gillis van Coninxloo. Landscape paintings in this style usually used the device of a division of nature into two distinct motifs with on one side, for instance, a hill with farms under trees and on the other, a steep valley with a river and a rolling plane. An example is the Extensive landscape with travelers on a path by a river, a cottage beyond (Sotheby's New York auction of 24 January 2008 lot 276). The figures in the work are likely by another artist and are in the style of contemporary Flemish painters such as David Vinckboons and Sebastiaen Vrancx. The palette with its brownish-yellow foliage and greenish-blue hills and the transparent blues in the cloudy skies are typical of Stalpaert's work. His latest known work, the Hilly landscape (signed and dated 1635, Rijksmuseum, Amsterdam shows a style closer to the more intimate Dutch style which was then developing.

A marine painting with the biblical story of Christ calming the storm is in an unknown collection in Germany. Painted in 1617, the design likely goes back to the print made by Cornelis Galle the Elder after a design by the Flemish artist Maerten de Vos. That print depicting The storm on the sea of Galilei was plate 8 in the 12-part Vita, passio et Resvrrectio Iesv Christ which was published by Adriaen Collaert in Antwerp in 1598. The print also shows the boat in a forward tilting position but its portrait format favours the focus on the main motif, which almost fills the entire space. Pieter Stalpaert, on the other hand, used a landscape format in which he integrated the story of Christ into the larger seascape. Through the wider framing of the story the figures of Christ and the disciples can only be recognised on closer inspection. As Stalpaert gives ample space to the raging ocean scene, the biblical figures appear to have been reduced to mere staffage.
