= Surrender of Tribsees =

1675 military surrender in Germany

- Part of the Scanian War
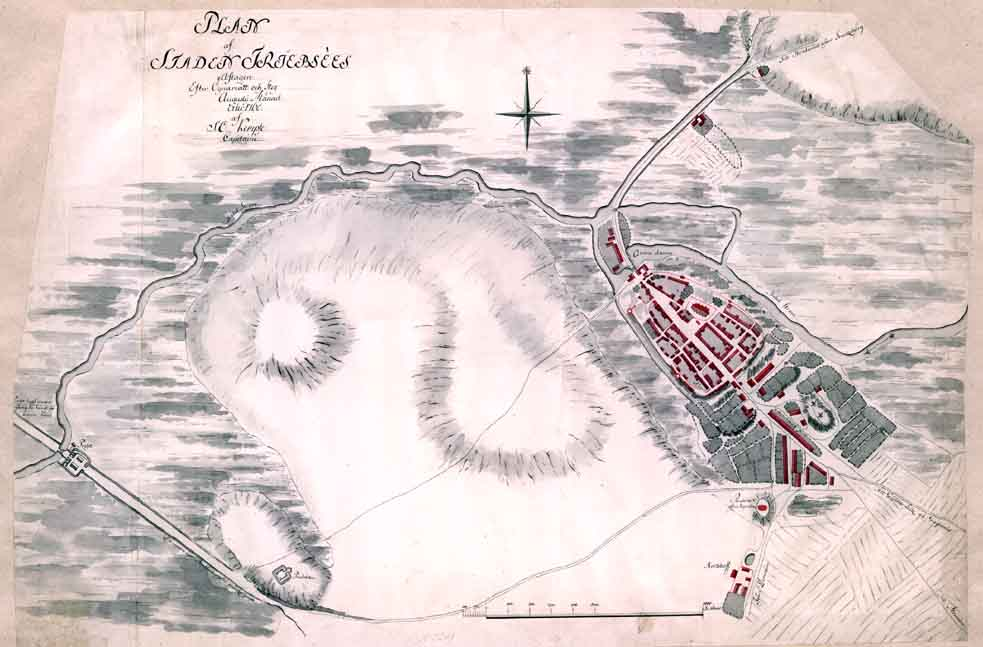
- Map over Tribsees in 1760, from the National Archives of Sweden
Date	6 October 1675
Location	Tribsees, Swedish Pomerania (present-day Germany) 54°05′N 12°45′E
Result	Danish victory
Territorial changes	Tribsees occupied by Denmark-Norway

Belligerents
Denmark-Norway	(yes) Swedish Empire

Commanders and leaders
(Denmark–Norway) Duncan	(Swedish Empire) Unknown Major (surrendered)

Units involved
(Denmark–Norway) Duncan's Regiment	(Swedish Empire) Tribsees redoubt

Strength
Unknown	27 men 4 cannons

Casualties and losses
Unknown	27 imprisoned 4 cannons taken

The Surrender of Tribsees (Danish: Overgivelsen af Tribsees, Swedish: Överlämnandet av Tribsees), also known as the Capitulation of Tribsees (Danish: Kapitulationen af Tribsees, Swedish: Kapitulationen av Tribsees), was a surrender of Swedish forces to the Danish General Duncan in the town of Tribsees on 6 October 1675 during the Scanian War.

== Background ==
In 1674, Sweden invaded Brandenburg to assist its ally, France. Denmark–Norway, who wanted to regain its lost territories, joined the anti-Swedish alliance and invaded the Swedish possessions in Germany in 1675. The Danes passed Wismar, and marched through Rostock, to Swedish Pomerania, where the Swedish forces were concentrated. The Danes and Brandenburgians constantly tried to make a bridgehead over the various Swedish-controlled rivers with little success. However, when Christian V of Denmark took Damgarten, he ordered General Duncan to take the redoubt in Tribsees.

== Surrender ==
Duncan arrived at the Swedish redoubt in Tribsees at Three O'Clock, and suggested to the Swedish commander, that he should meet and make an agreement. However, this was declined by the Swedish major general. In the morning the following day, the suggestions were repeated. But now, the major general had considered the negotiations and met personally with Duncan to announce, without instructions, that he would surrender the Swedish redoubt.

== Aftermath ==
The garrison, which consisted of the major general and 26 others, became prisoners of war, and 4 cannons and a heavy amount of ammunition were taken from the redoubt. In the following weeks, the Allied forces were able to take more Swedish land, and the Swedish campaign ended in a failure.

== See also ==
- Battle of Fehrbellin – 1675 battle
- Battle of Lund – 1676 battle of the Scanian War
- Battle of Halmstad – 1676 battle of the Scanian War
- Invasion of Rügen (1678)

== Works cited ==
- Jensen, N.P (1900). Den Skaanske Krig [The Scanian War] (PDF) (in Danish). DET NORDISKE FORLAG.
- Vaupell, Otto (1880). Rigskansler Grev Griffenfeld: et Bidrag til Nordens Historie i det 17de Hundredaar (in Danish). Copenhagen: Reitzels Forlag.
