= View on the Amstel from Amsteldijk =

Painting by Jacob van Ruisdael

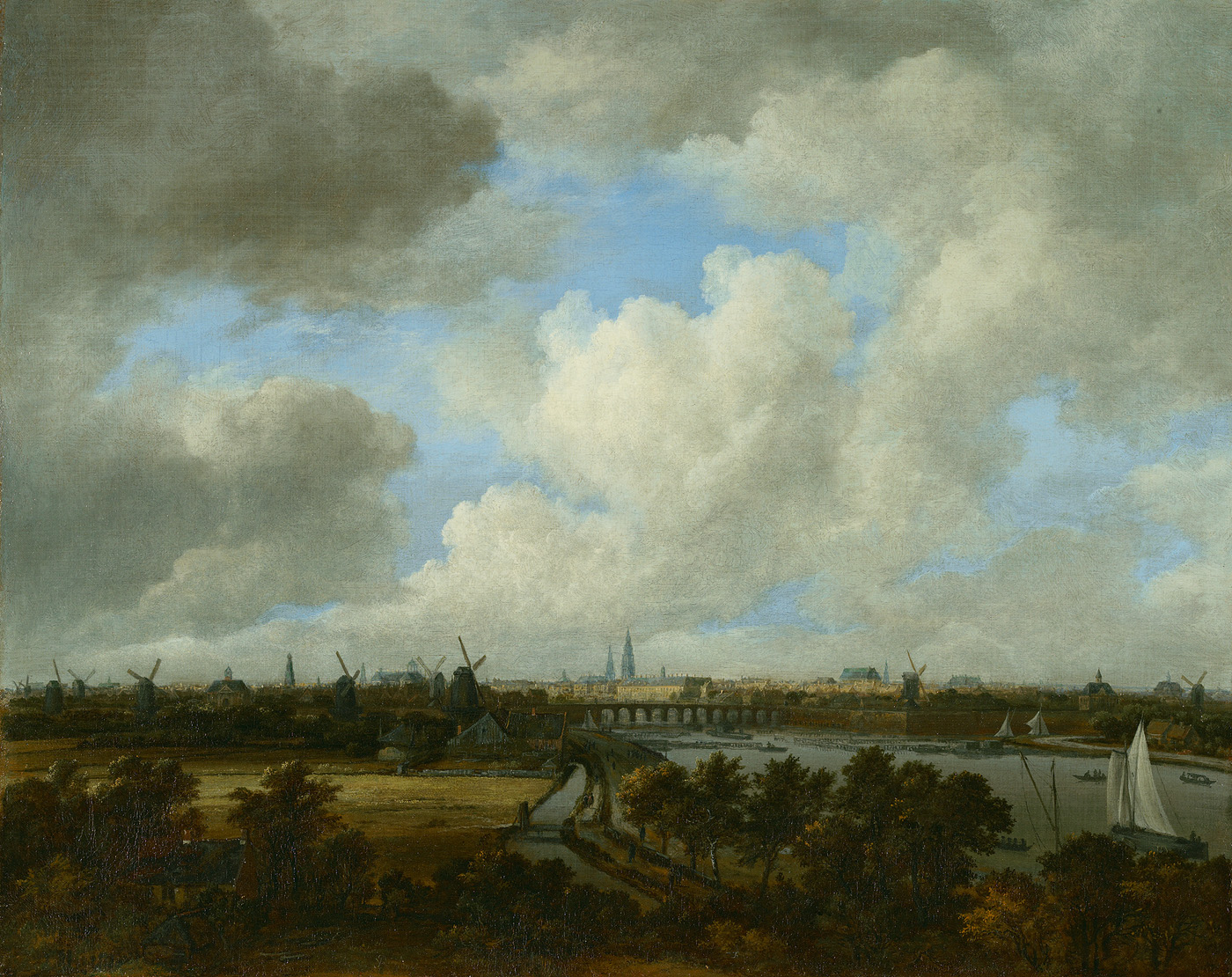
- Artist: Jacob van Ruisdael
- Year: c. 1680
- Dimensions: 53.4 cm × 67.6 cm (21.0 in × 26.6 in)
- Location: Amsterdam Museum; Amsterdam
- Website: Amsterdam Collection online

View on the Amstel from Amsteldijk (c. 1680) is an oil on canvas painting by the Dutch landscape painter Jacob van Ruisdael. It is an example of Dutch Golden Age painting and is now in the collection of the Amsterdam Museum.

This painting was purchased in 2007 with support from the Vereniging Rembrandt as an important artifact of Amsterdam history. It was documented by Hofstede de Groot in 1911, who wrote; "17. View of Amsterdam. The Amstel fills the right-hand side of the picture. In the centre is a canal bordered by a meadow. A ray of light illumines the town. In the sky are masses of storm-cloud. Canvas. Sale. Comte de Morny, Paris, May 24, 1852, No. 24 (3100 francs)."

According to Vereniging Rembrandt, the steeples in this painting are from left to right: Leidsepoort, Utrechtsepoort, Westerkerk, Stadhuis (Dam), Oude Kerk, Zuiderkerk, Portugees-Joodse Synagoge, 's Lands zeemagazijn, Weesperpoort, Oosterkerk. All of these buildings had been recently designed and built under the supervision of the city architect Daniël Stalpaert.

This scene is very similar to other paintings Ruisdael made in this period of Amsterdam and these often served as inspiration for later painters of landscape.

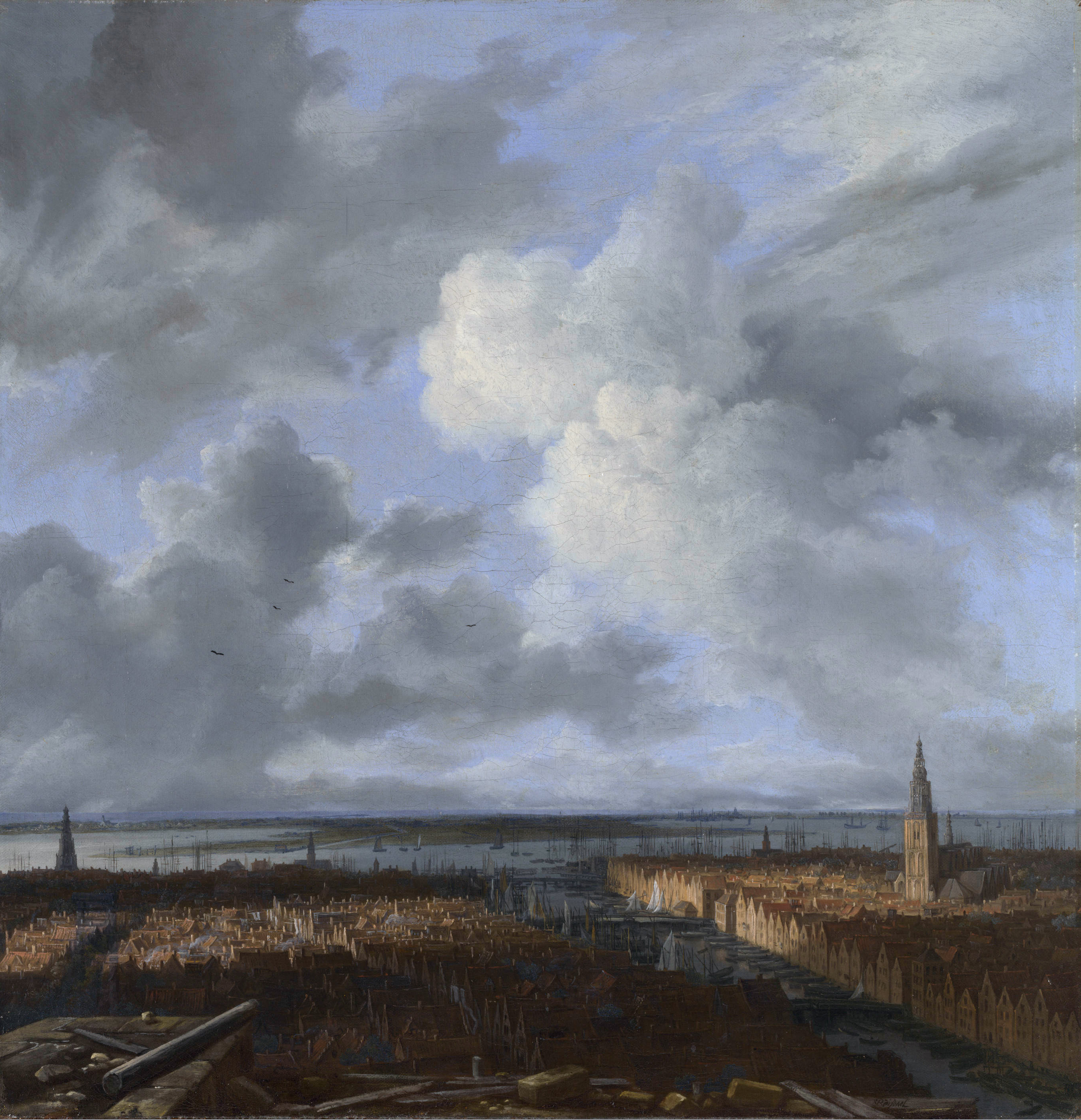
National Gallery.

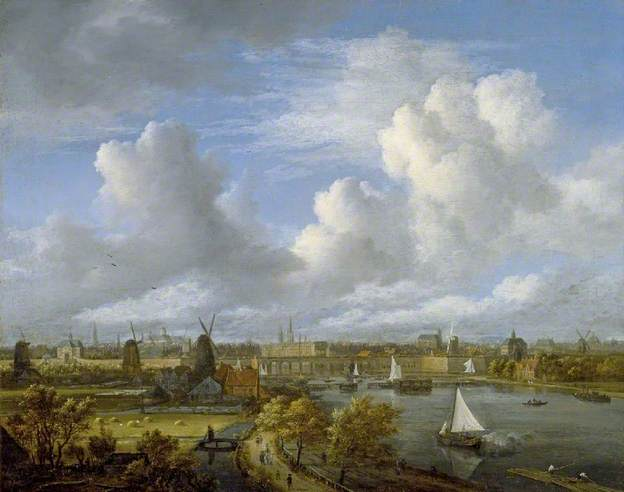
Fitzwilliam Museum.

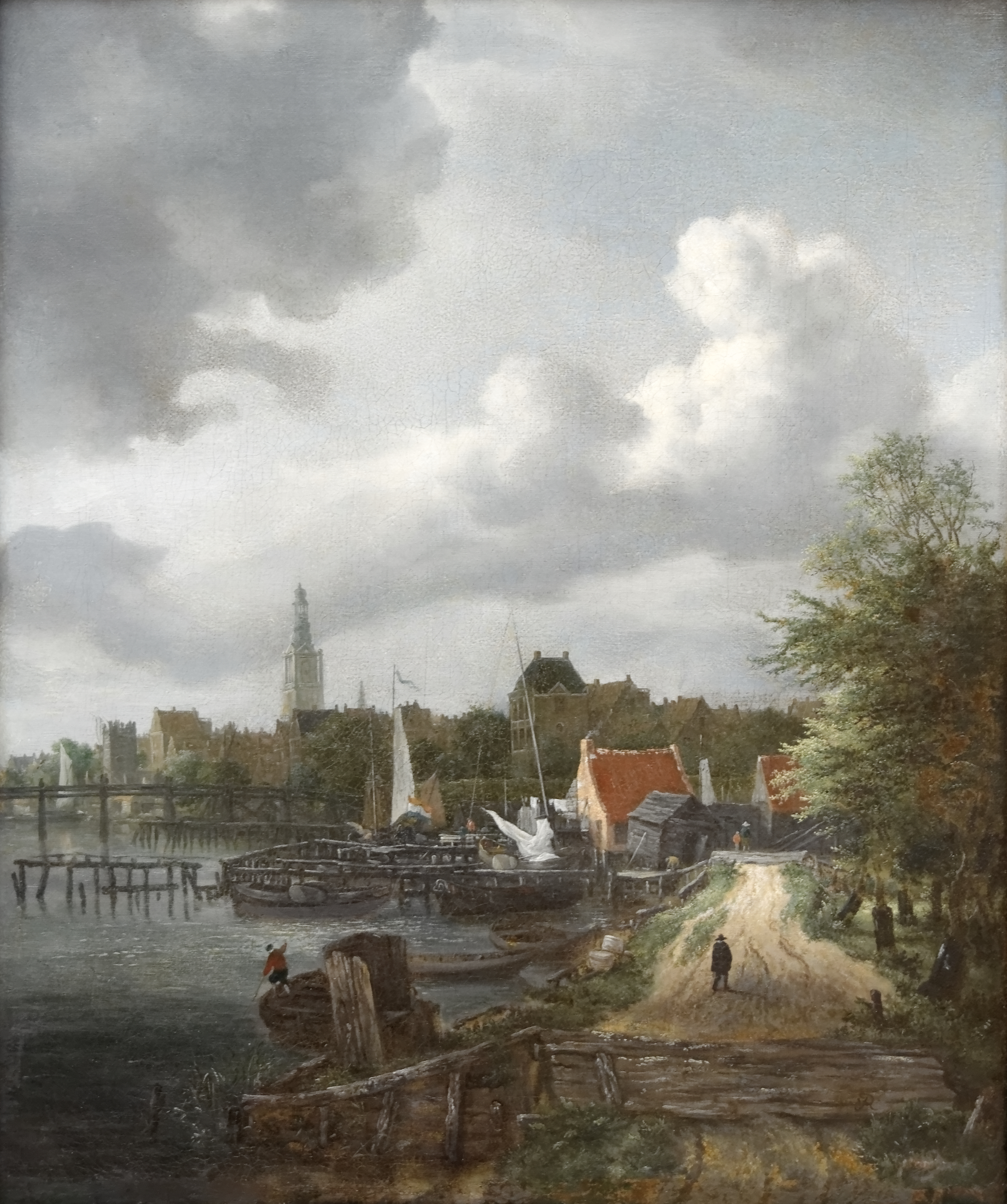
Museum of Fine Arts (Budapest).

== See also ==
- List of paintings by Jacob van Ruisdael
