= Walls of Amsterdam =

Series of historic walls built around the city of Amsterdam, Netherlands

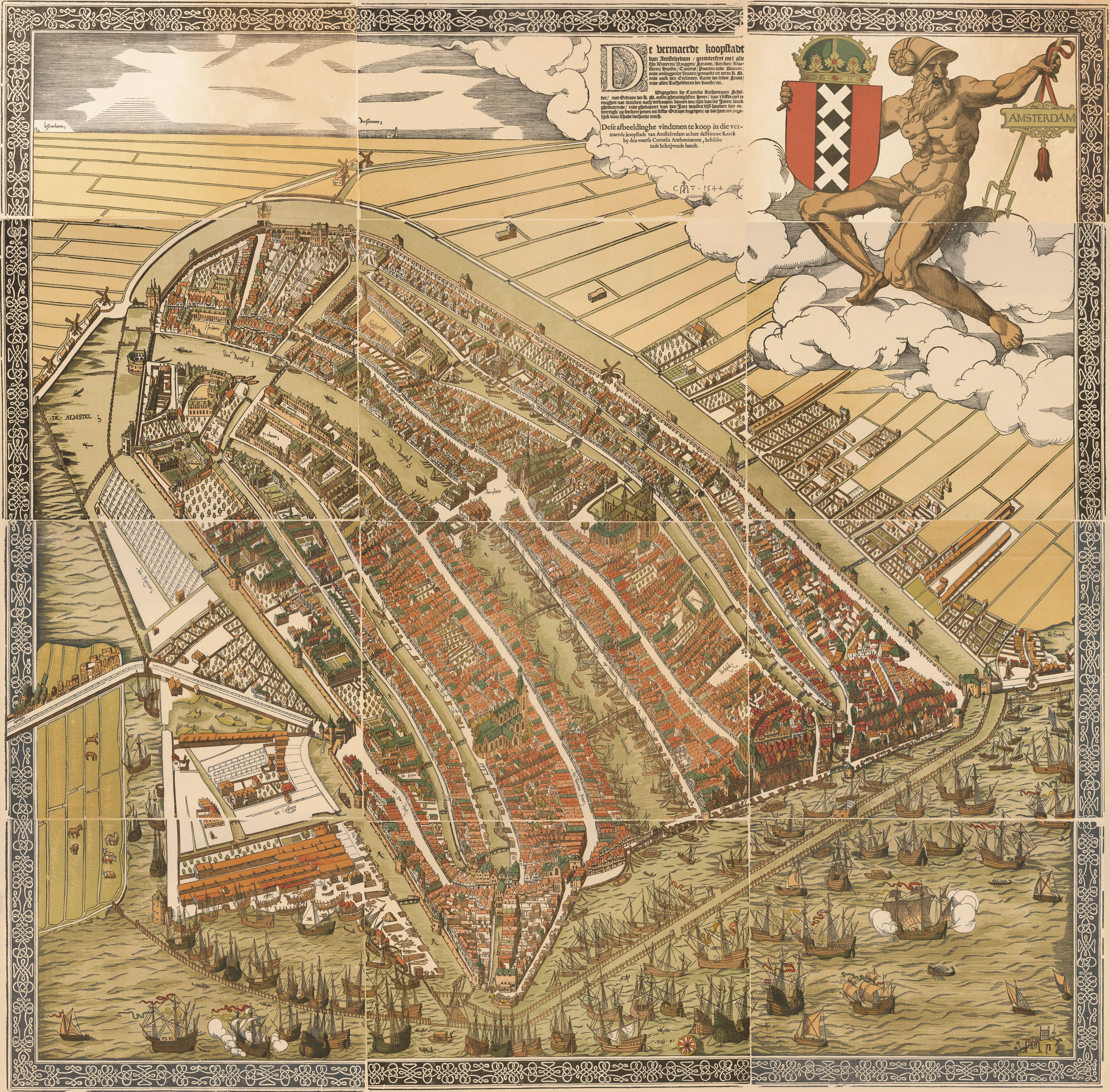
The medieval city with its walls, gates and towers can be seen on this map by Cornelis Anthoniszoon dating to 1538

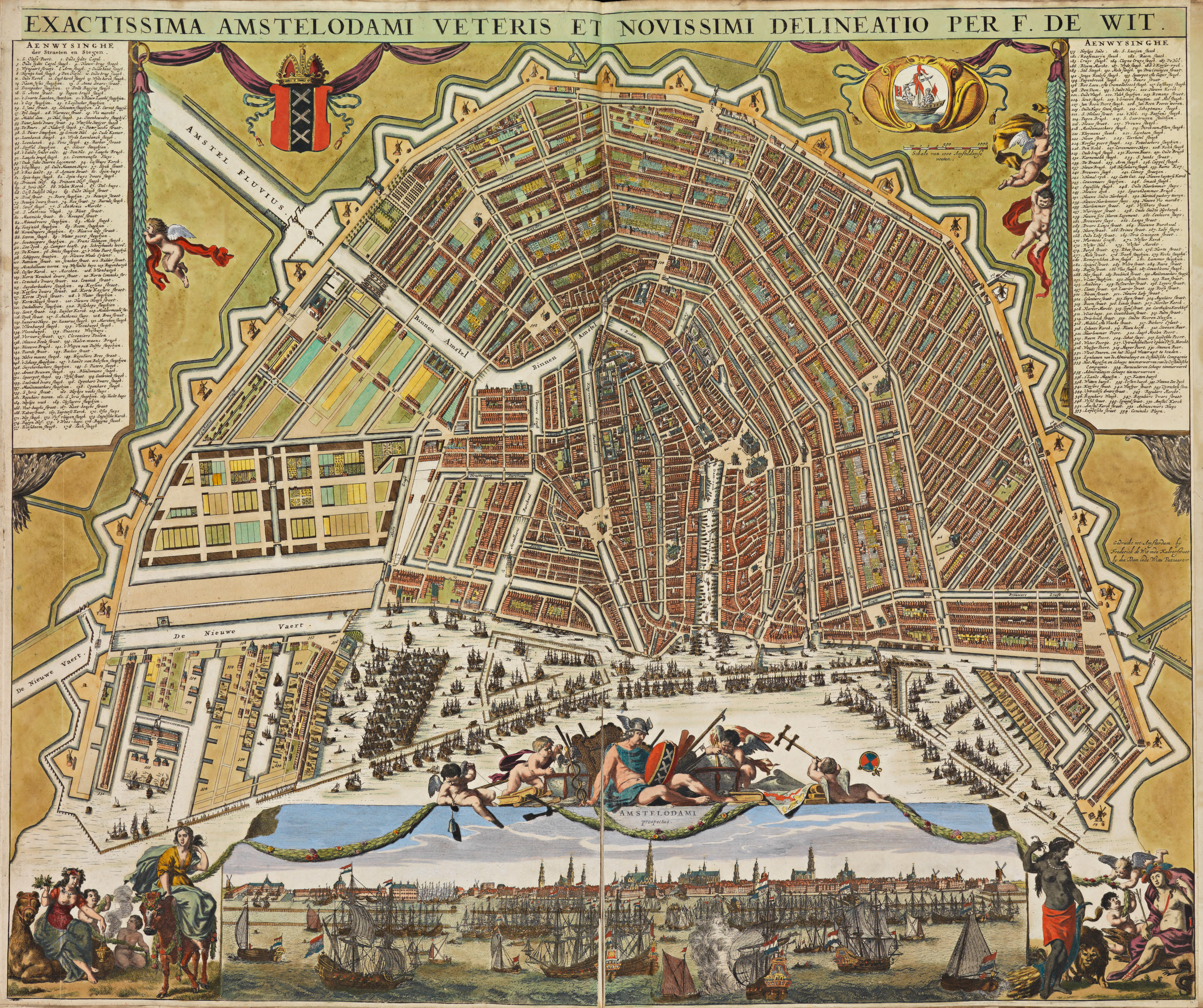
The 17th-century walls with 26 bastions can be seen on this city map by Frederik de Wit

The walls of Amsterdam (Dutch: Vestingwerken van Amsterdam) were built in the Middle Ages to protect the city against attack. The Medieval walls were replaced with a series of bastions in the 17th century. In the 19th century, the walls were torn down and replaced with the Defence Line of Amsterdam (Dutch: Stelling van Amsterdam), a fortification line which encircled Amsterdam at a distance from the city.

Remains of the medieval and 17th-century defenses include the former city gates Waag and Munttoren, as well as the defensive tower Schreierstoren and the watchtower Montelbaanstoren.

== History ==
=== Earthen walls ===
Around the year 1300, an earthen wall had been erected behind the Nieuwendijk dike. Traces of this wall were discovered during archeological excavations around Nieuwezijds Kolk in 1994. Following the Siege of Amsterdam in 1303, Count William III of Holland withdrew the privilege of Amsterdam to have defenses, forcing the town to remove the wall.

About 40 years later, around 1340, new walls were constructed, both along the eastern oudezijde ("old side") and along the western nieuwezijde ("new side") of the Amstel river. On either side of the town, a moat was dug, and a wall topped by a wooden palisade was then built on the inner side of the moat. When in 1385 new walls and moats were built beyond these original walls and canals, the existing walls became known as Achterburgwal ("back wall") and the new walls were called Voorburgwal ("front wall"). This is how the canals Oudezijds Voorburgwal, Oudezijds Achterburgwal, Nieuwezijds Voorburgwal and Nieuwezijds Achterburgwal got their name.

The city walls had three gates:

- Sint Olofspoort at the northern end of the Warmoesstraat street
- Haarlemmerpoort at the western end of the Nieuwendijk
- Bindwijkerpoort on the southern edge of the city, by Spui.

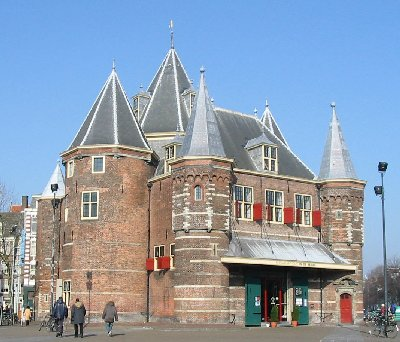
The Waag, originally the city gate Sint Antoniespoort

In 1425 the city expanded and a new moat was dug, which still exists as the Singel, Kloveniersburgwal and Geldersekade canals. Along the inner side of the canal, an earthen wall was built with three gates: a new Haarlemmerpoort gate, the Sint-Antoniespoort (now the Waag), and the Regulierspoort (now the bottom half of Munttoren tower).

=== Stone walls ===
After visiting Amsterdam in 1481, Emperor Maximilian I decreed that the town was to build stone walls to safeguard against attacks by the Duchy of Guelders and the Bishopric of Utrecht. The city had to pay for the walls itself, and instituted a tax to fund the costly project. Construction started in 1482 and took about 20 years to complete, all in all.

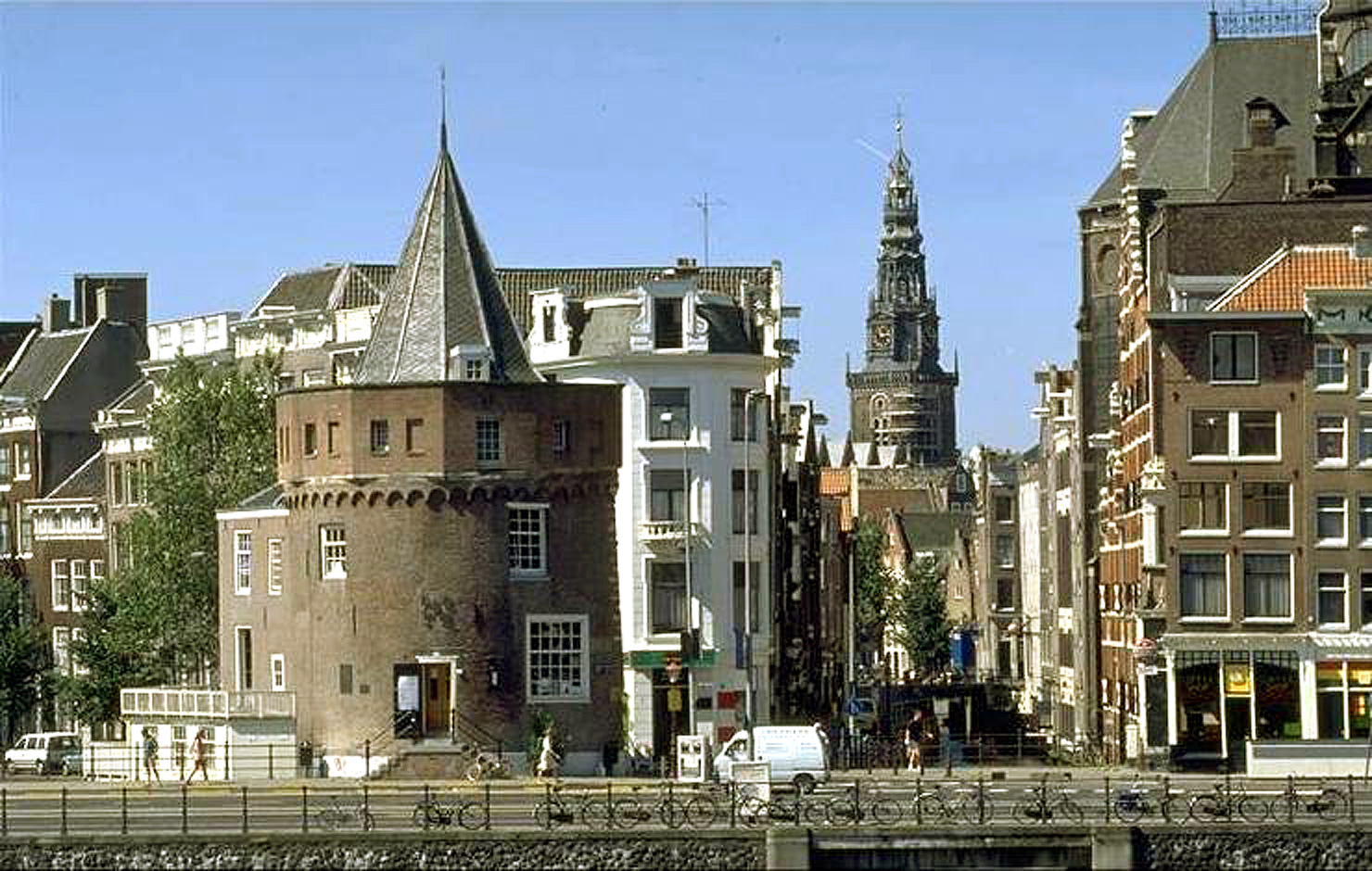
The Schreierstoren tower (left)

The end result was a brick wall, 5 to 6 metres high, supported by stone arches. The walls encircled the entire town, with the exception of the harbour front on the IJ bay along the northern side of the city. At regular intervals along the walls, a number of semicircular defensive towers were built. One of these towers is still standing, the Schreierstoren, built around 1487.

In 1494, a ceremony was held to mark the completion of the city walls. Ironically, by that time the walls were already antiquated. The walls were built to withstand medieval sieges and attacks with stone cannonballs, but gunpowder and iron had by then come into general use for attacks on walled cities.

The city walls had five gates:

- Haarlemmerpoort
- Regulierspoort (now the bottom half of Munttoren tower)
- Sint Antoniespoort (now the Waag)
- Heiligewegpoort
- Korsjespoort

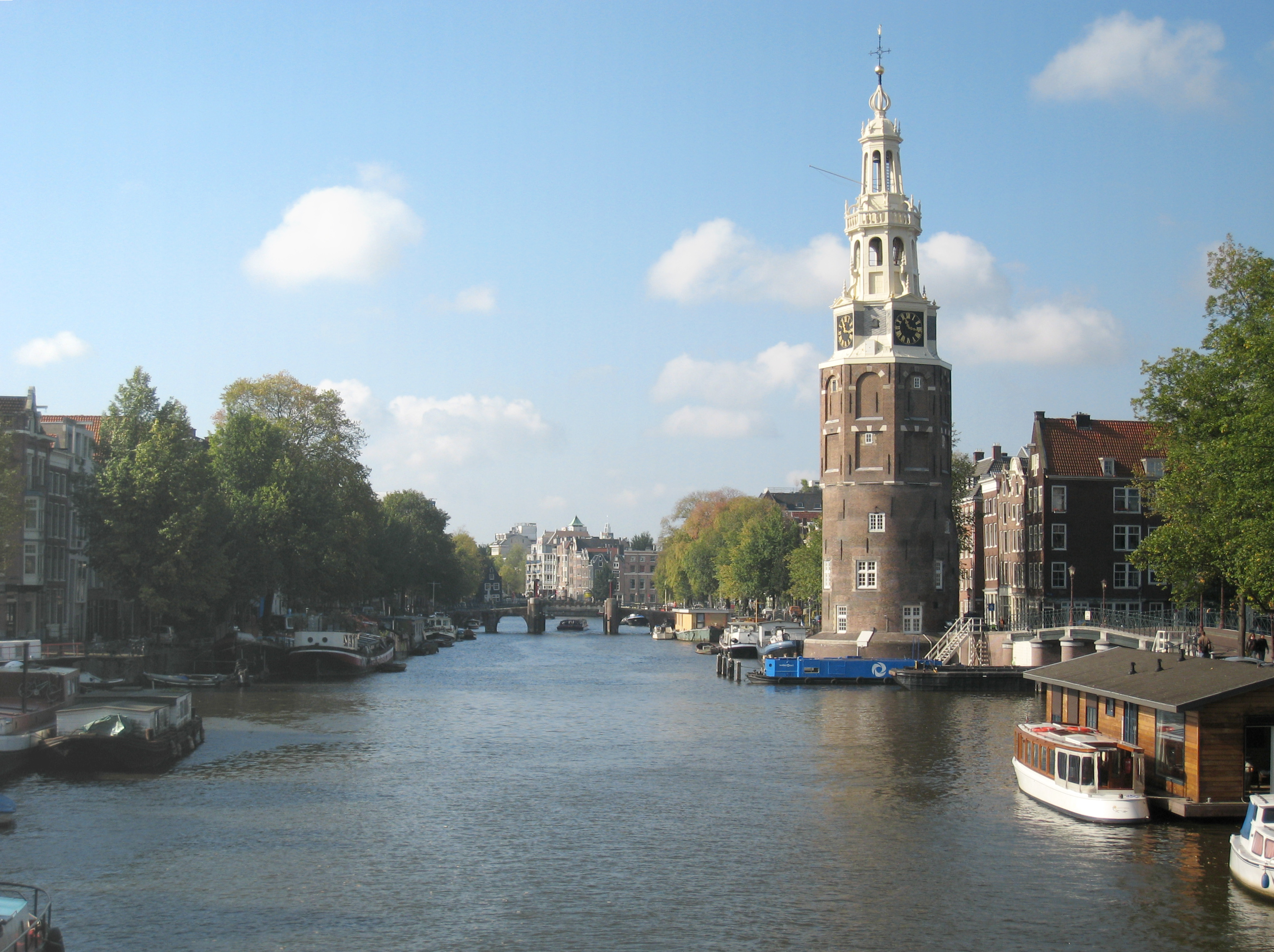
The Oudeschans canal, with Montelbaanstoren tower (right)

In 1512, troops from the Duchy of Guelders attacked the city and looted the Lastage, an area of shipyards beyond the city walls on the eastern side of the town. To protect the Lastage, a new moat was dug in the period 1515-1518. By expanding a branch of the Amstel river, the Nieuwe Gracht ("New Canal", now the Oudeschans) canal was created. The soil produced by widening the river branch into a canal was used to build a wall along the inner side of the canal, topped by a wooden palissade. As part of these new defensive works, the Montelbaanstoren was built around 1516 as a watchtower.

=== Bastions ===
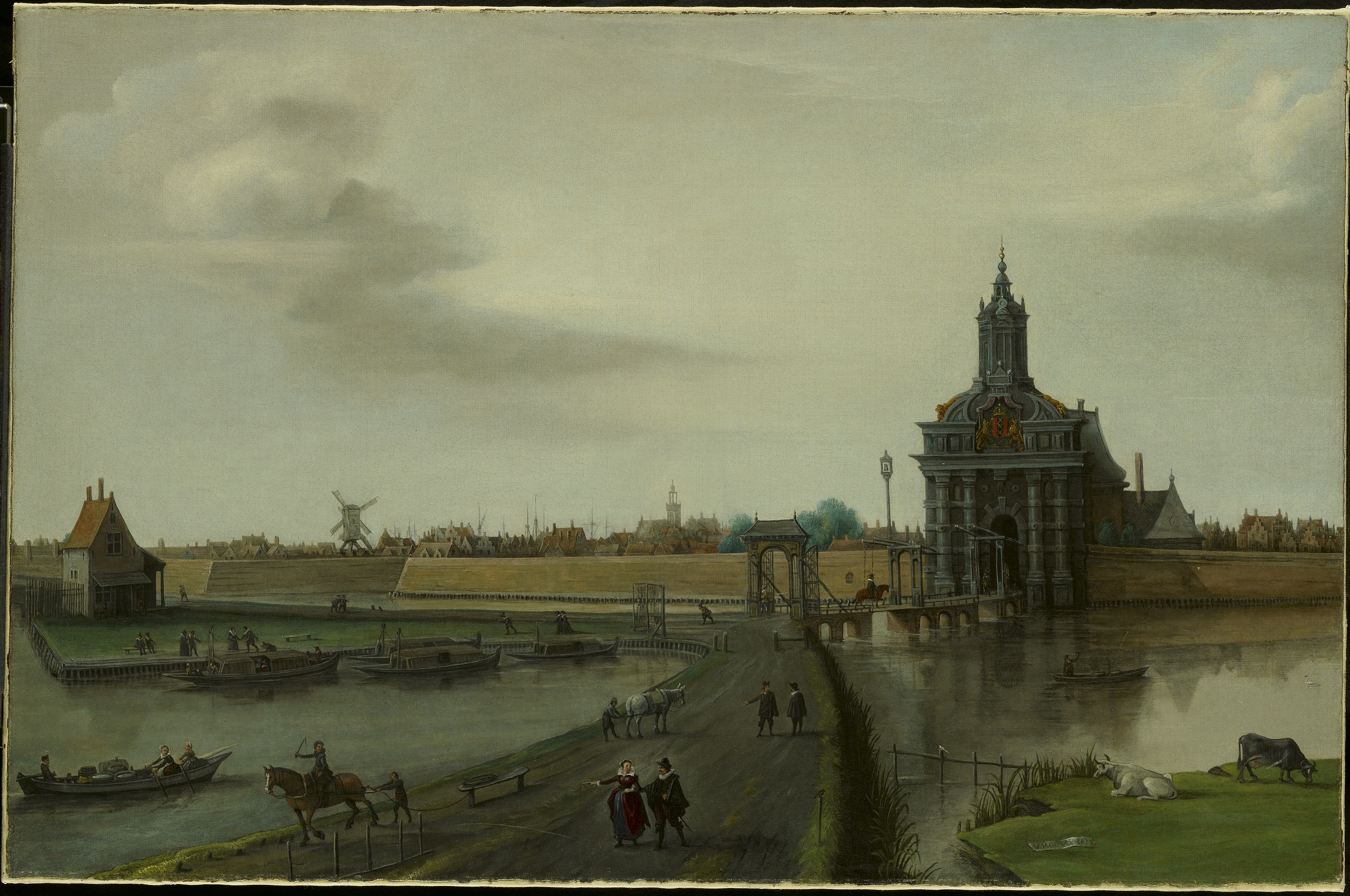
The 17th-century Haarlemmerpoort gate, designed by Hendrick de Keyser

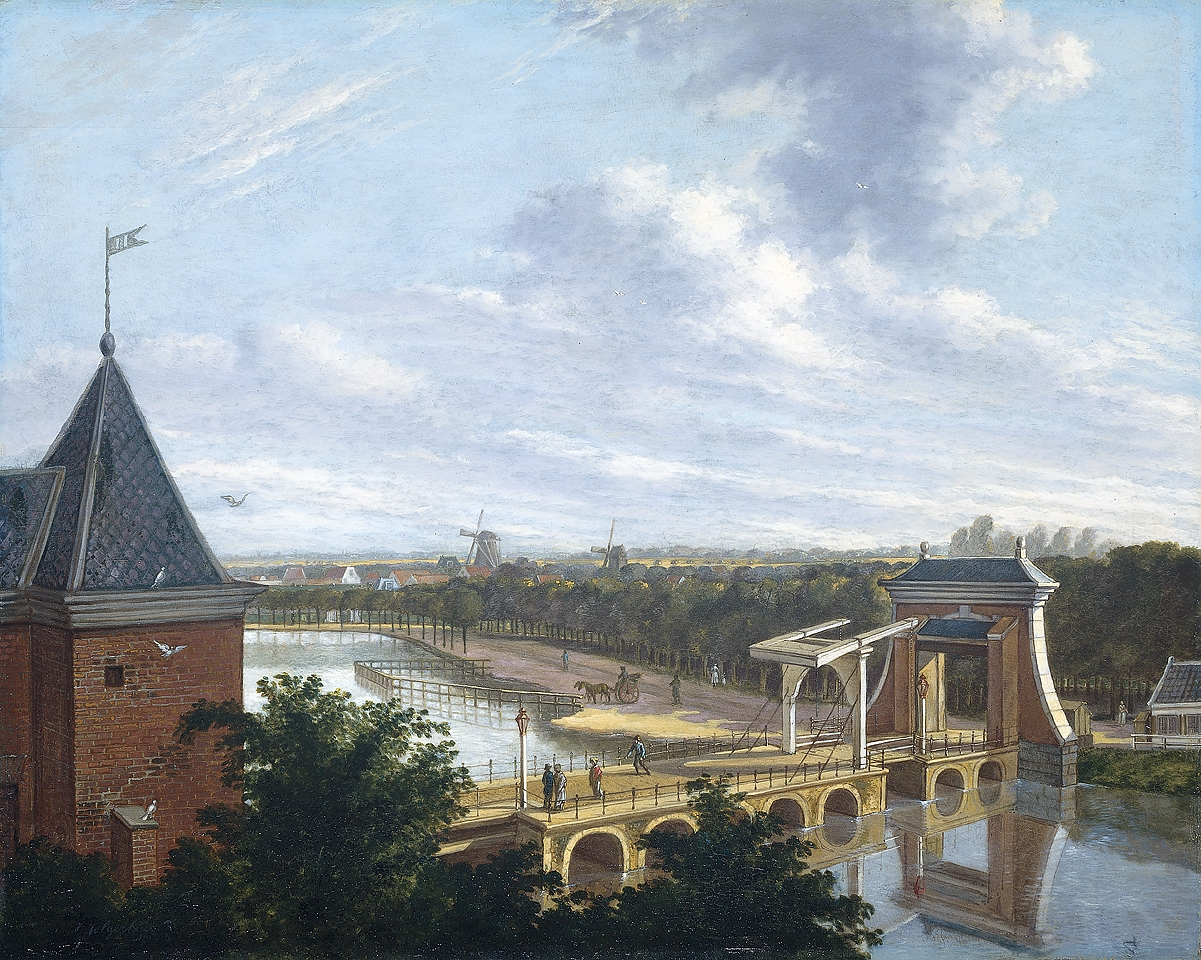
The Singelgracht canal at Leidsepoort gate, depicted in an 1816 painting by Johannes Jelgerhuis

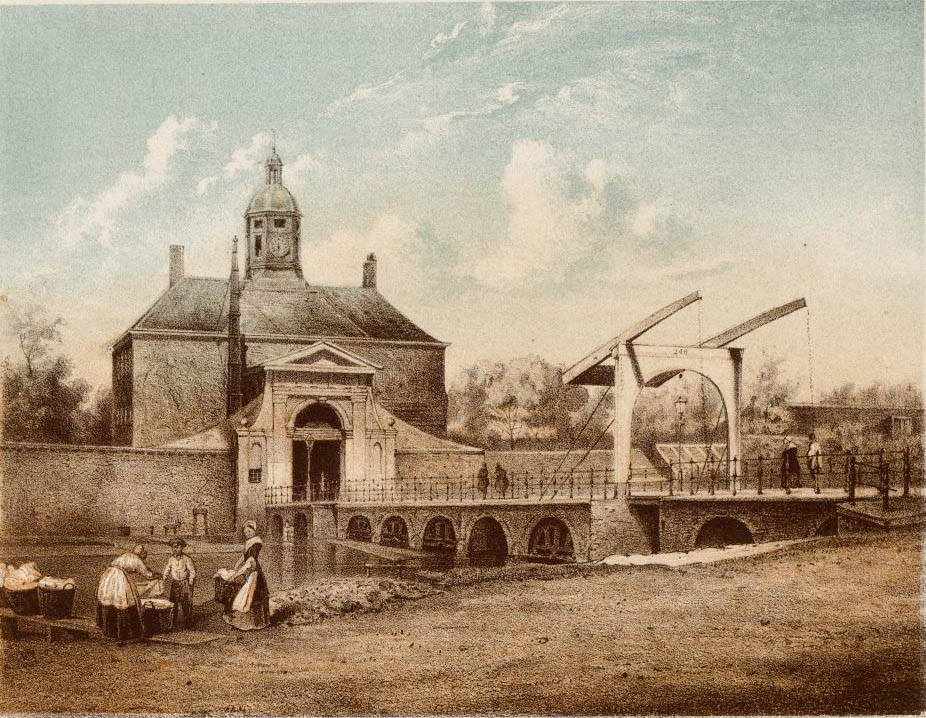
A colored lithograph of the Utrechtsepoort by Willem Hekking, July 1858. This gate was located on the south side of what is now the Frederiksplein.

During the 17th century, the city expanded rapidly. To protect the grand new grachtengordel (the concentric belt of canals), a system of 26 bastions was constructed along the Singelgracht canal.

Immediately following the Alteratie in 1578, the city began to strengthen the weak spots in its defenses. For instance, a bastion was constructed by the Haarlemmerpoort gate, which at that time lay near Herenmarkt square. William of Orange ordered the fortifications engineer Adriaen Anthonisz to Amsterdam in 1581 in order to oversee the construction of the new defensive works.

In 1585, the city government decided to construct new earthen walls with 11 bastions beyond the existing walls. The city was expanding so rapidly that the area between the old and new walls was filled with new houses within a matter of a few years. In 1613 it was decided to construct new defensive walls with bastions on the western side of town, along the current Marnixstraat and Weteringschans streets, with a new outer moat (the Buitensingel, now Singelgracht) and inner moat (the Lijnbaansgracht). Within these new walls, the grachtengordel (the concentric belt of canals) could now be constructed.

Amsterdam in 1657 began to construct fortifications to protect its fourth and largest 17th-century city expansion. This was one of the most ambitious construction projects undertaken in the 17th-century Dutch republic. Supporting the heavy walls on the porous Amsterdam soil required large numbers of deep foundation piles and retaining walls. Thousands of labourers transported soil and sand from the dunes and the Gooi using carts and wheelbarrows. Kilometers of retaining walls were built, canals were dug, and bridges and sluice gates were constructed. Around 1663, the massive project was complete.

The walls rested on a nine metres deep wooden floor, supported by over 100,000 piles with crossbeams. On the top of the wooden floor, brick arches were built. Each bastion had 44 arches and each curtain wall had 47 arches. The arches were then covered with soil, and the walls were covered with stone. The walls were supported by 14 kilometres of retaining walls to prevent the soil from sinking away.

The fortifications consisted of 26 bastions in total. In the flanks of these bastions were casemates with cannon and munition. Windmills were placed on top of most of the bastions.

There were five main gates in the 17th-century fortifications:

- Haarlemmerpoort
- Leidsepoort
- Utrechtsepoort
- Weesperpoort
- Muiderpoort

In addition, there were several smaller gates:

- Weteringpoort
- Raampoort
- Zaagmolenpoort

The city walls were never seriously put to the test. During the Rampjaar of 1672, the Dutch Water Line proved sufficient to stop the invading French troops from taking Amsterdam. The fortifications were neglected and began to decay. In 1769, for instance, the Muiderpoort gate collapsed, and in 1794, part of the Reguliersbolwerk bastion sank into the canal. Following the Napoleonic era, the bastions were turned into a park area. A path was constructed along the top of the bastions so that the citizens of Amsterdam could go for a leisurely stroll. In the period 1839-1848, the city defenses were gradually demolished. The final remaining curtain wall, between the bastions Rijkeroord and Slotermeer, was demolished in 1862 and replaced with a path for strolling. The gates were left standing but were repurposed as offices for tax collection.

During the Industrial Revolution in the second half of the 19th century, the city started expanding beyond its 17th-century walls. The former bastions, now an area of recreation, were largely replaced with new buildings, and the Singelgracht canal was straightened; the bastions which had once jutted out were now no longer visible.

=== Fortification lines ===
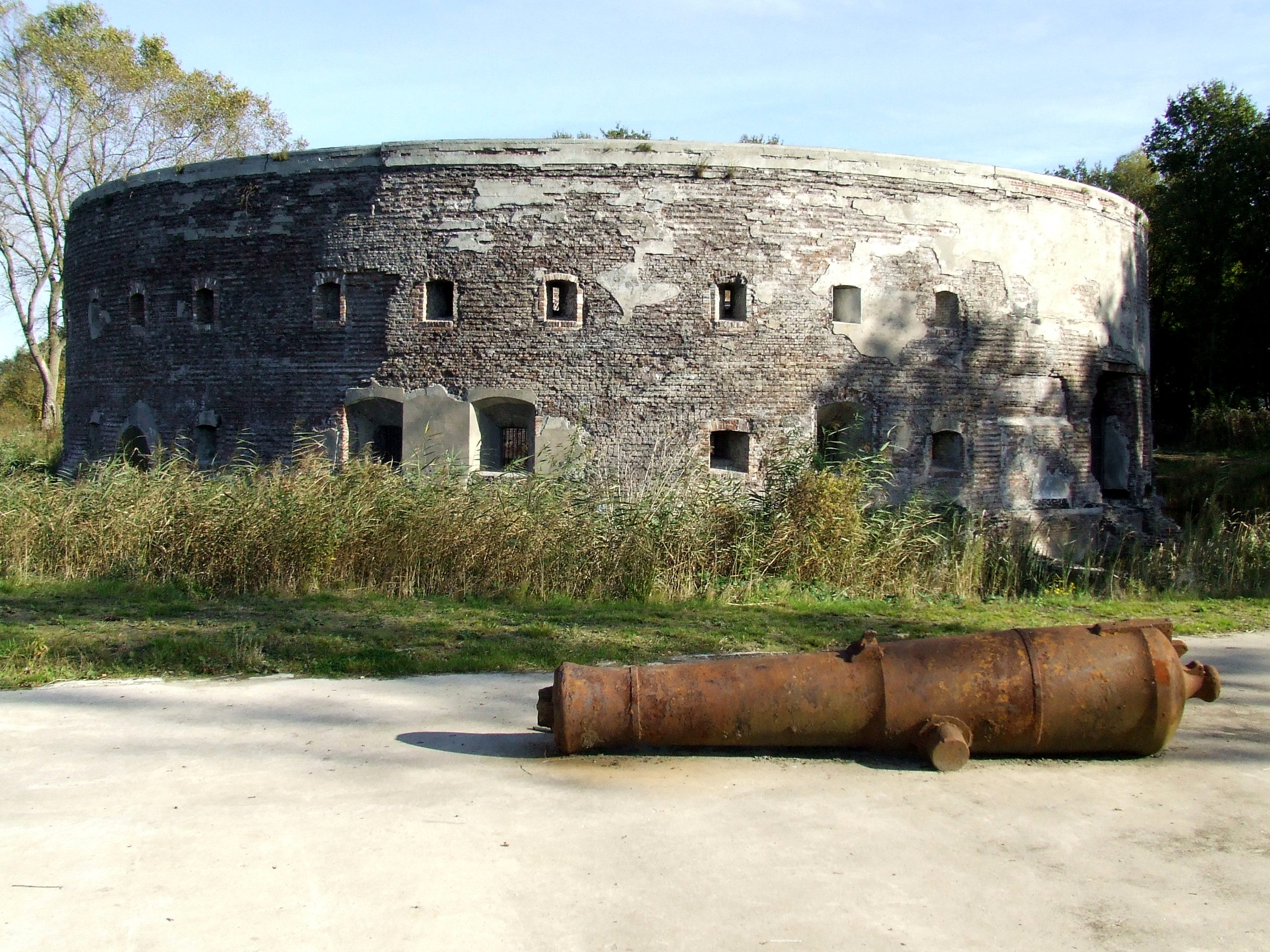
Fort bij Uitermeer, one of the forts of the Defence Line of Amsterdam (Stelling van Amsterdam)

In 1787, the Patriotten city government sought to protect the city against the Prussians by erecting 27 defensive posts along the seven entrances into the city. The polders between each of these posts were flooded. The Prussians were unable to overcome these defenses, but managed to get by the posts using the poorly defended entrance by the Haarlemmermeer.

During the Anglo-Russian invasion of Holland in 1799, Cornelis Krayenhoff protected the capital by erecting the Linie van Noord-Holland ("North Holland Line"). He flooded the lower-lying areas between Monnickendam and Krommeniedijk, and protected the higher situated areas using earthen walls and field artillery. A year later, Krayenhoff oversaw the construction of a second defensive line, west of Amsterdam, the Linie van Beverwijk ("Beverwijk Line"), consisting of three lines of lunettes. The lunettes were spaced at a distance of 400 metres from each other. Ten of these lunettes still remain.

Krayenhoff reused a number of the 1787 defensive posts for the Posten van Krayenhoff ("Krayenhoff Posts"), a defensive line constructed around Amsterdam in the period 1805-1810.

The range and accuracy of artillery significantly improved as a result of the Industrial Revolution. To keep the city out of range of enemy artillery fire, it was decided to build a new line of fortifications around Amsterdam, at 15 to 20 kilometres' distance from the city centre. This Defence Line of Amsterdam (Stelling van Amsterdam), constructed in the years 1880-1914, was the most modern and largest-area circular fortification system in Europe in its day. The line stretched 135 kilometres and included 42 forts as well as four artillery batteries. The line was never tested, but did have a deterrent effect. In 1914, at the outbreak of World War I, the Defence Line, as well as the Dutch Water Line, were a factor in the German decision not to invade the Netherlands. The Defence Line has survived largely intact and was named a World Heritage Site in 1996.

== Remains ==
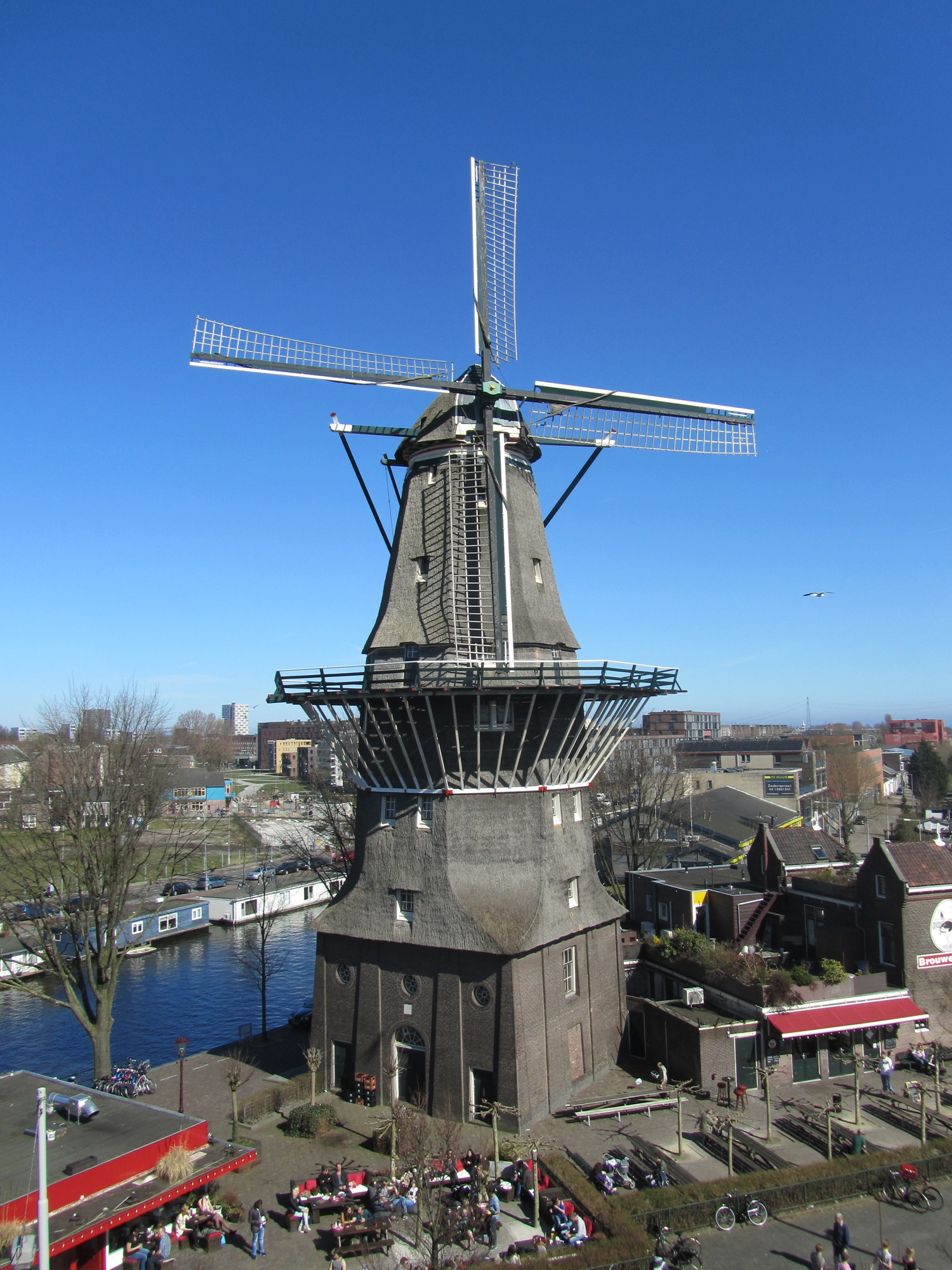
Windmill De Gooyer originally stood on top of the Oosterbeer bastion

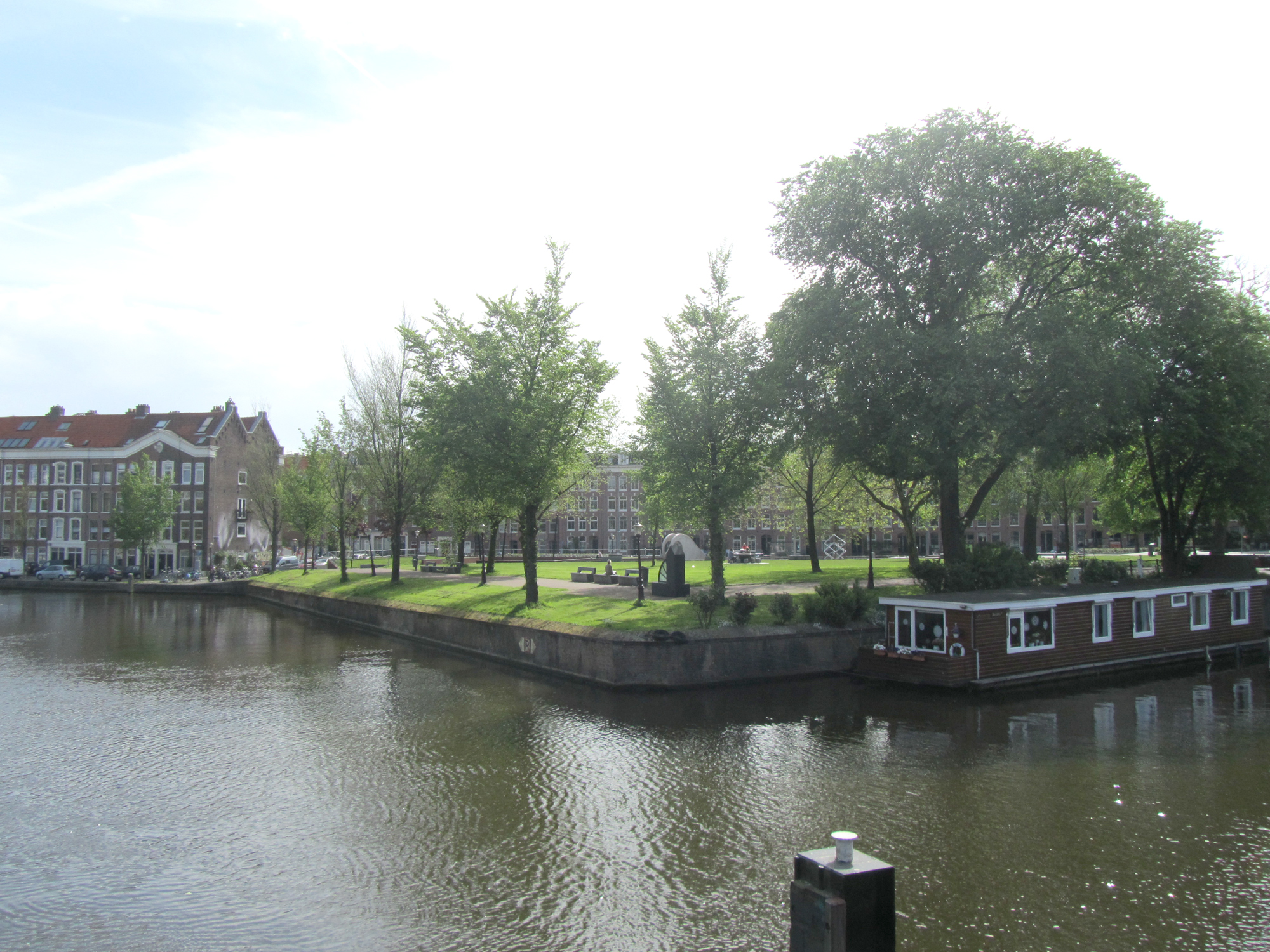
The park Eerste Marnixplantsoen, formerly Haarlem bastion. This is the only remaining site along Singelgracht canal that still has the pointed shape of a bastion

The well-known red-light district around the canals Oudezijds Voorburgwal and Oudezijds Achterburgwal is still known as De Wallen ("The Walls"), after the original medieval earthen walls.

Remains of the medieval defensive works include the Waag (originally Sint Antoniespoort gate) and the bottom half of Munttoren tower (originally Regulierspoort gate), as well as the defensive tower Schreierstoren and the watchtower Montelbaanstoren.

In the Geldersekade canal walls, there are still some sandstone fragments of the original medieval city walls. On 19 June 2007, part of the medieval walls was briefly exposed when a four metres deep hole was dug to inspect the foundations of the Waag.

A few patches remain of the park that was constructed on top of the bastions in the 19th century. These include the Eerste Weteringplantsoen, Tweede Weteringplantsoen, Eerste Marnixplantsoen, and Tweede Marnixplantsoen. The Eerste Marnixplantsoen, formerly bastion Haarlem, is the only remaining site along Singelgracht canal that still has the pointed shape of a bastion. Two windmills remain of the mills that stood on top of the bastions: De Gooyer and De Bloem. However, neither windmill still stands on its original location.

Although Singelgracht canal was straightened, the canal and the Nassaukade, Stadhouderskade and Mauritskade streets along the canal still follow a zigzag pattern, revealing the location of former bastions.

== Bolwerkenroute ==
In 2010, the Bolwerkenroute Amsterdam was presented. This route is to consist of 26 stone plaques at each of the 17th-century bastions. The first plaque, measuring 60 by 60 centimetres, was presented on 24 February 2010 at Max Euweplein square. The route was an initiative of local mime artist Rob van Reijn.
