= Waag, Amsterdam =

15th-century weigh house in Amsterdam

Coordinates: 52°22′22″N 4°54′01″E

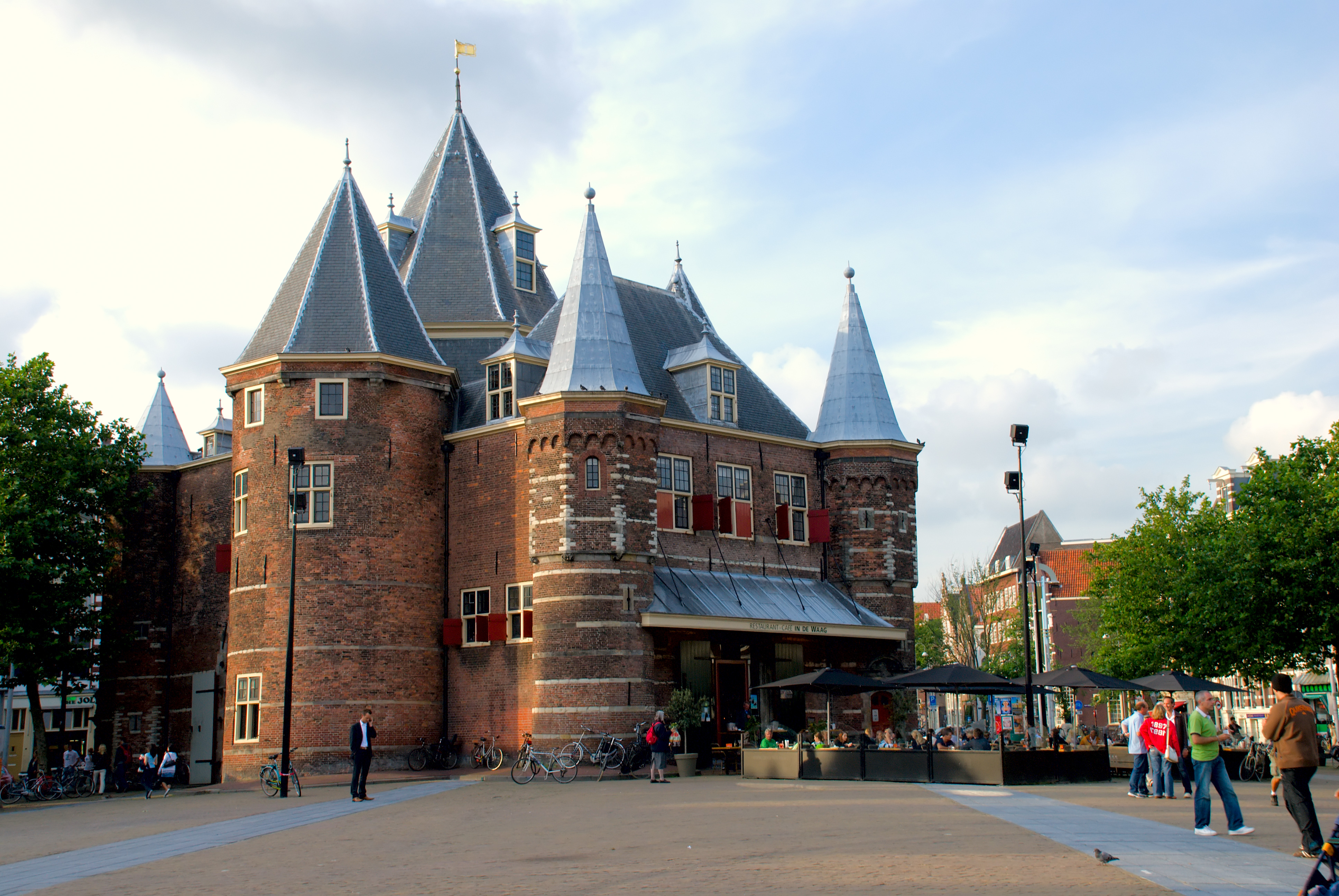
The Waag

The Waag ("weigh house") is a 15th-century building on Nieuwmarkt square in Amsterdam. It was originally a city gate and part of the walls of Amsterdam. Later it served as a guildhall, museum, fire station and anatomical theatre, among other things.

The Waag is the oldest remaining non-religious building in Amsterdam. The building was listed as a national monument (rijksmonument) in 1970.

The Waag is depicted in Rembrandt's 1632 painting The Anatomy Lesson of Dr. Nicolaes Tulp. The surgeons' guild commissioned this painting for their guildhall in the Waag.

== History ==
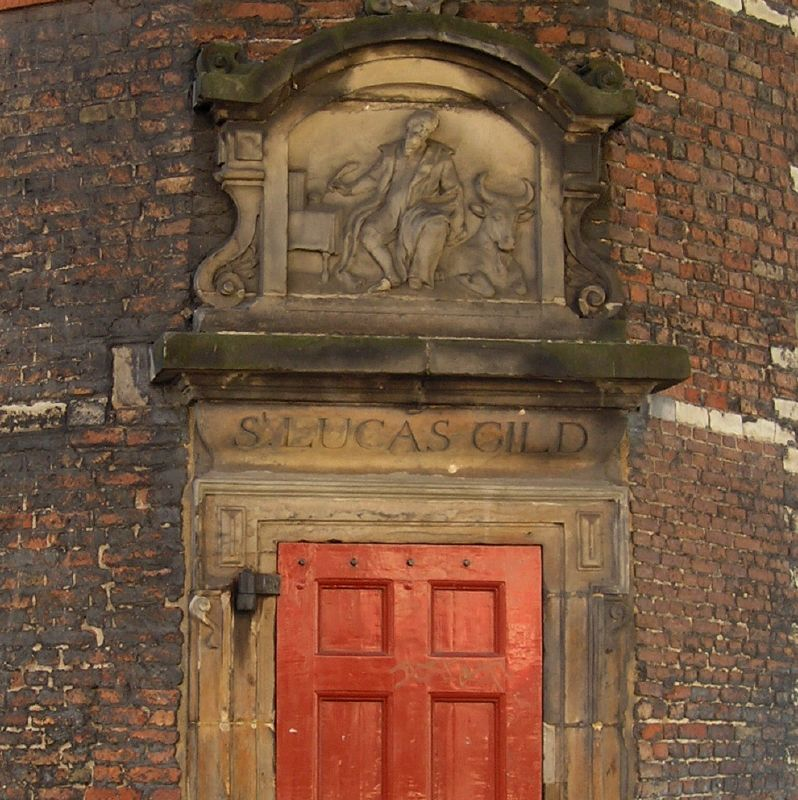
Gate of the Guild of Saint Luke (the painters' guild).

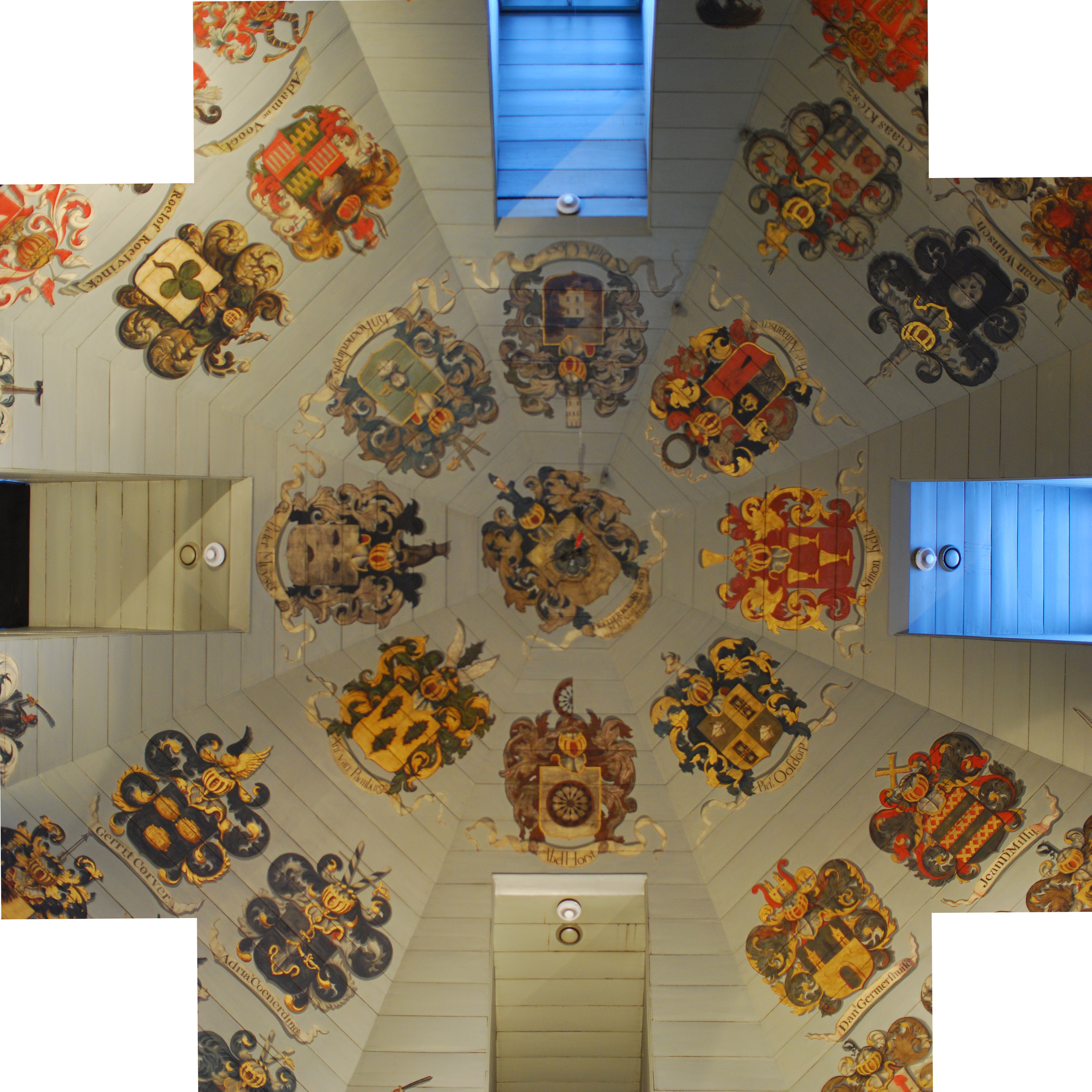
Ceiling of the anatomical theatre.

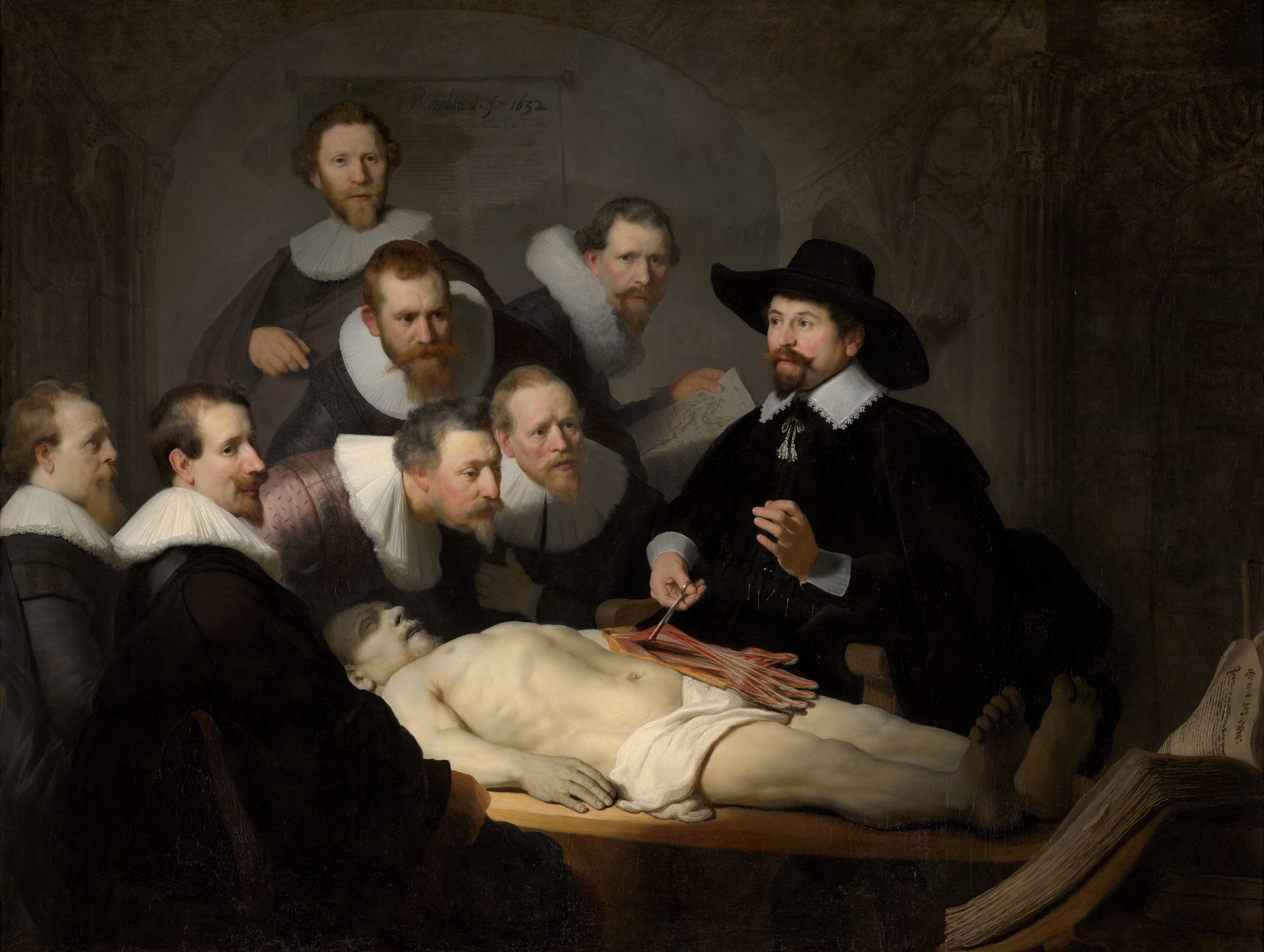
Rembrandt's The Anatomy Lesson of Dr. Nicolaes Tulp.

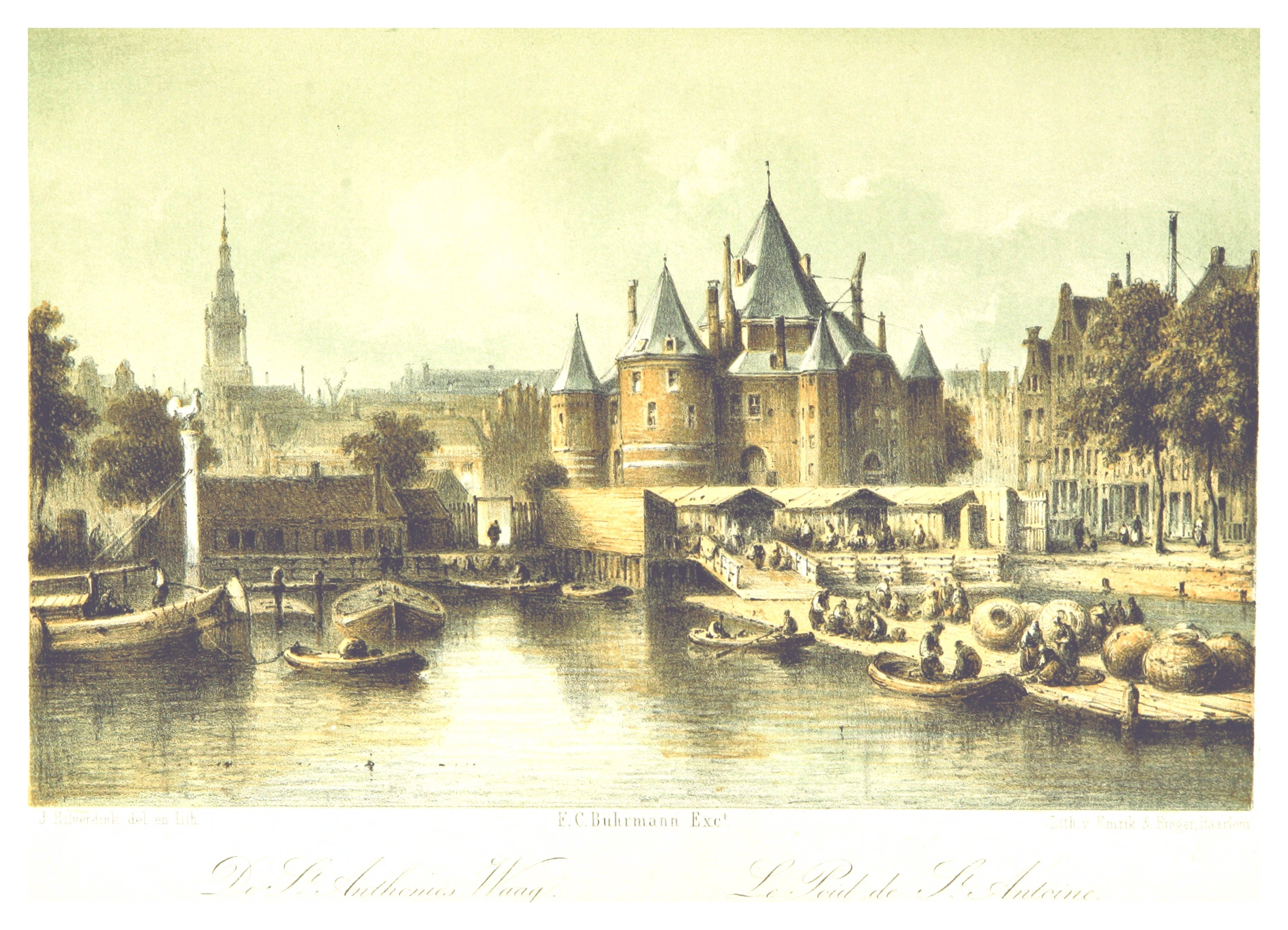
The Waag in an 1860 illustration.

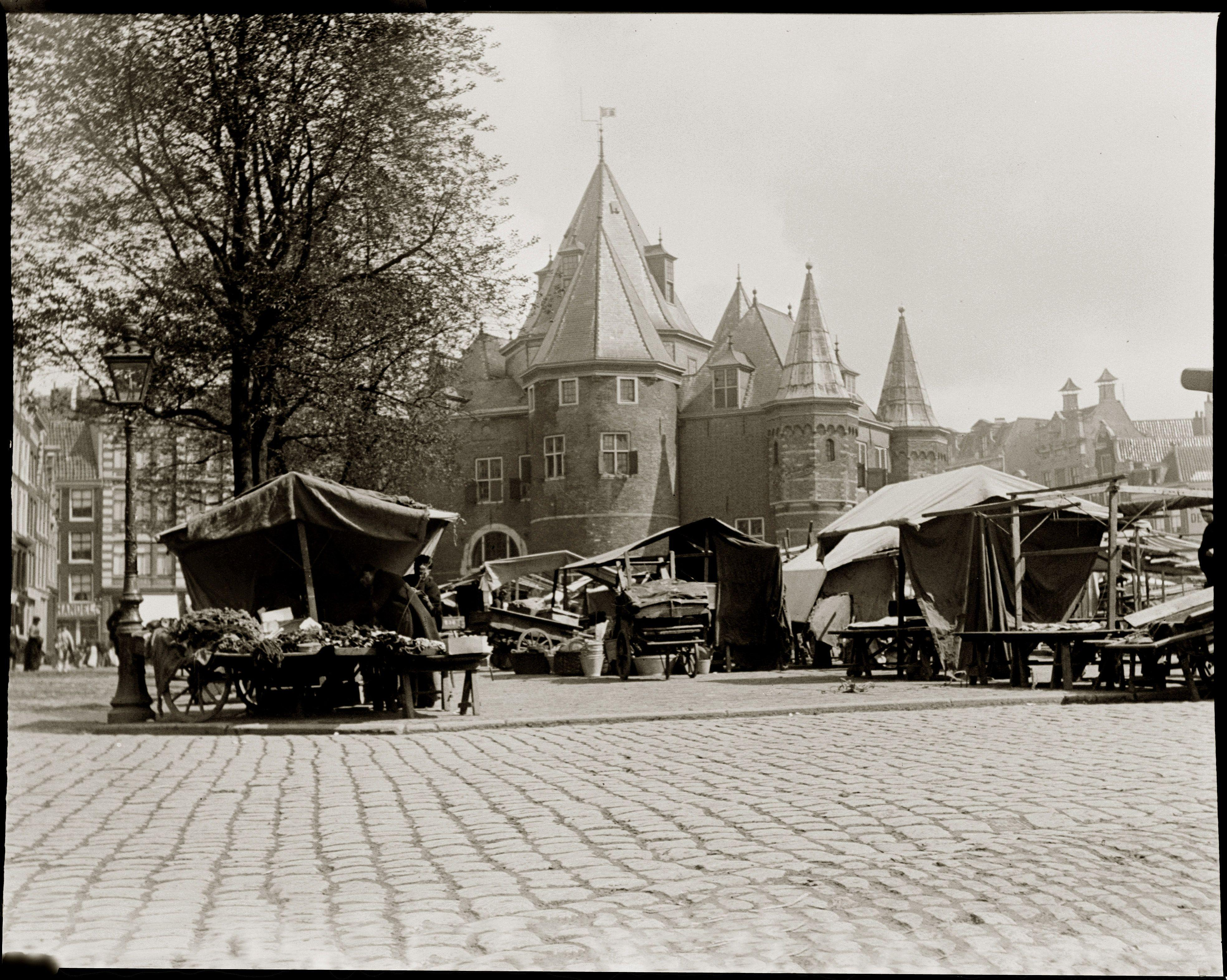
The Waag, 1902 photograph by Jacob Olie.

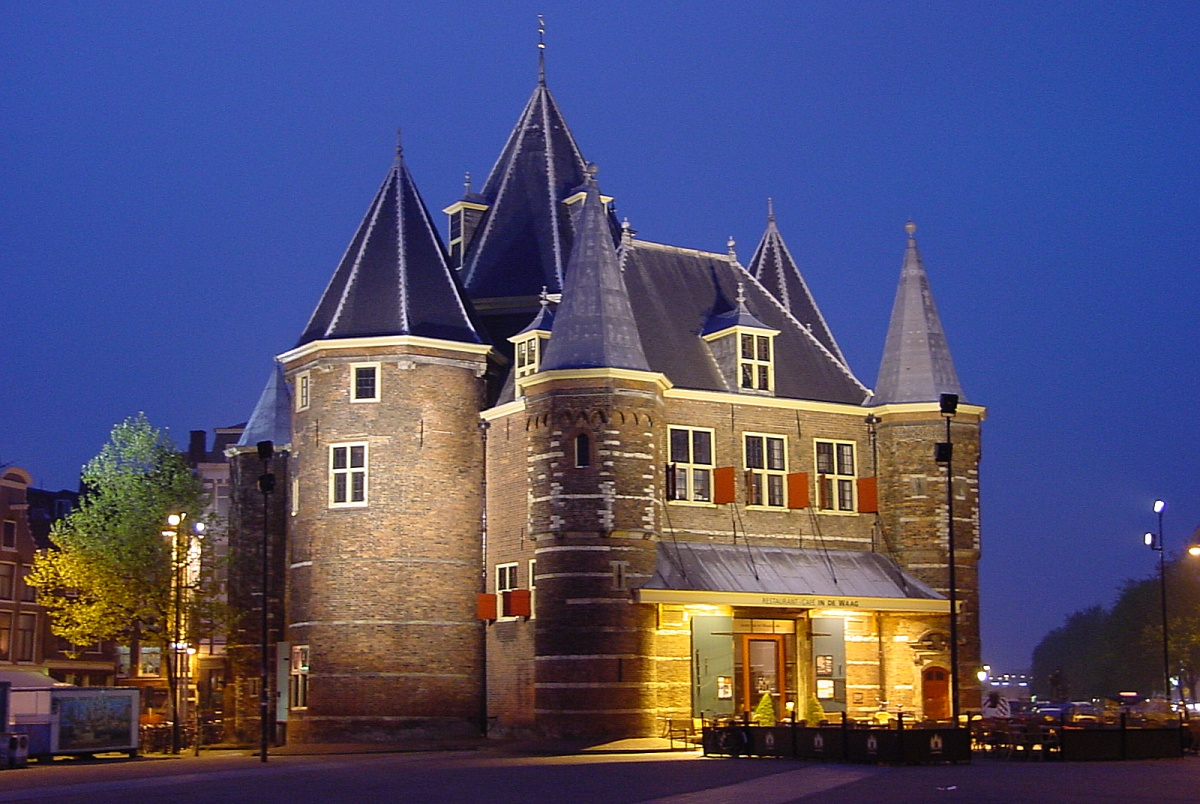
The Waag by night. Note the awning added in the 1990s.

=== City gate ===
Originally, the building was one of the gates in the city wall, the Sint Antoniespoort (Saint Anthony's Gate). The gate was located at the end of the Zeedijk, a dike, which continued beyond the gate as the Sint Antoniesdijk. After the Lastage area was added to the city in the 16th century, the Sint Antoniesdijk became the Sint Antoniesbreestraat and a new Sint Antoniespoort city gate was built near the Hortus Botanicus.

The city gate was part of the medieval city walls along the moat formed by the current Singel canal and the Kloveniersburgwal and the Geldersekade canals. These walls were constructed during the period 1481–1494 and consisted of defensive towers and city gates connected by brick walls with a natural stone pediment. All that remains of the walls is some sandstone in the Geldersekade canal wall. The only remains of the city gates are the Waag and part of the Regulierspoort gate, which is now the bottom half of the Munttoren tower. The Schreierstoren is the only remaining defensive tower.

The oldest gable stone in Amsterdam adorns the facade of the tower at the corner of Zeedijk and Geldersekade. It carries the inscription MCCCCLXXXVIII de XXVIII dach in April wart d'eerste steen van dese poert gheleit. ("The first stone of this gate was laid on 28 April 1488"). The year of construction 1488, as given on the gable stone and in many sources, may need to be corrected. There are clues that the gate may be of a much older date. For instance, there are several documents in the city archives of Amsterdam that pre-date 1488 and mention Saint Anthony's Gate. According to building archaeologist Jacqueline de Graauw, the building probably dates back to as early as 1425, because that is when the city was expanded and the Geldersekade and Kloveniersburgwal canals, where the gate was placed, were dug.

De Graauw also found that Saint Anthony's Gate was originally much smaller, and was heightened at a later date. This is evident from the remains of merlons halfway up the towers of the Guild of Saint Eligius and the schuttersgilde (militia) - the two big towers on either side of the main gate. Also, the front gate, which differs from the main gate in several ways, was probably added to the main gate at a later date. These kinds of additions were commonplace at that time, as a protection against the increasing threat posed by canons. In Haarlem, for example, a front gate was added to the Amsterdam Gate in 1482 which is very similar to the front gate of Saint Anthony's Gate. Presumably the gable stone in Saint Anthony's Gate with the date 1488 refers simply to the addition of the front gate to the already existing main gate.

From around the beginning of the 16th century, when Amsterdam had completed its surrounding stone city wall, Saint Anthony's Gate appeared as it is depicted in the wood carvings of Cornelis Anthonisz: a main gate with four towers on the inner (city) side — of which the masons' guild tower was still small — and a front gate with two towers on the outer (canal) side. Between the front gate and main gate, there was a small square covering a subterraneous sluice gate. The walls of the towers are almost 2 metres thick.

When the city expanded beyond its walls the late 16th century, Saint Anthony's Gate lost its function as a city gate. Shortly thereafter, during the years 1603–1613, the walls were demolished. In 1614, the present Nieuwmarkt square was created by covering the canal on either side of the gate. In addition, the square was raised, causing part of the brickwork of the gate to disappear below ground. This makes the building appear shorter than it actually is.

=== Weigh house ===
In 1617, the former city gate was repurposed as a weigh house, a public building where various goods were weighed. This new weigh house was needed to relieve the Waag op de Dam, the original weigh house on Dam square, which had become too small for the needs of the rapidly growing city.

An inner courtyard was added in 1617–1618 by covering the area between the front and main gates. A number of guilds were housed on the top floors of the building: the blacksmiths' guild, the painter's guild, the masons' guild and the surgeons' guild. Each guild had its own entrance gate. The guild emblems are still visible over these entrances. The gate of the masons' guild includes sculpture work by Hendrick de Keyser. Over the entrance for the surgeons' guild is the inscription Theatrum Anatomicum.

In 1690–1691, a large dome-shaped hall was added, topped by a central octagonal tower. The interior also dates to this time period.

The Waag eventually lost its function as a weigh house. In 1819, a chest of indigo was the last item to be weighed there.

=== 19th and 20th centuries ===
After falling into disuse as a weigh house, the Waag served a range of different functions. In the 19th century it was used consecutively as a fencing hall, a furniture workshop, a workshop for oil lamps used for street lighting, a fire station, and as the city archives. In the first half of the 19th century, punishments were carried out in front of the building. There was even a guillotine.

In the 20th century, the building was used primarily as a museum. It was the original location of the Amsterdams Historisch Museum (now Amsterdam Museum) as well as the Joods Historisch Museum (Jewish Historical Museum). In the period 1989–1994, the building was not used and stood empty. Eventually the building was handed over to a foundation, Stichting Centrum De Waag, which commissioned Philippe Starck to design a glass extension that would have required part of the outer wall to be demolished. However, the foundation went bankrupt before these plans were carried out.

On 20 September 1991, local residents and preservationists opened the disused building to the press and the public. A general sense of dismay, which also resounded in the city council, led to the appointment of a commission of experts, which proposed to have the building restored under the guidance of an architect with expert knowledge of medieval construction and foundation. Walter Kramer was appointed to lead the restoration.

During restoration, the cellars (which had been filled in) were reopened, and a wooden awning was added to the eastern facade. The paving around the building was changed so that de Waag again became the central point on Nieuwmarkt square.

=== 21st century ===
Following the restoration, the building was rented out. Waag Society, a foundation that aims to foster experimentation with new technologies, art and culture, is housed on the upper floors. The ground floor is now Restaurant-Café In de Waag.

The building is slowly sinking due to the porous soil and the cement that was used for the restoration. In July 2009 it was falsely reported in the media that one of the towers was about to collapse. However, the foundation will need to be improved or replaced in order to remedy the situation. In February 2011, a frame was built around the tower to support it and prevent it from collapsing.
