= Oranje-Nassau Kazerne =

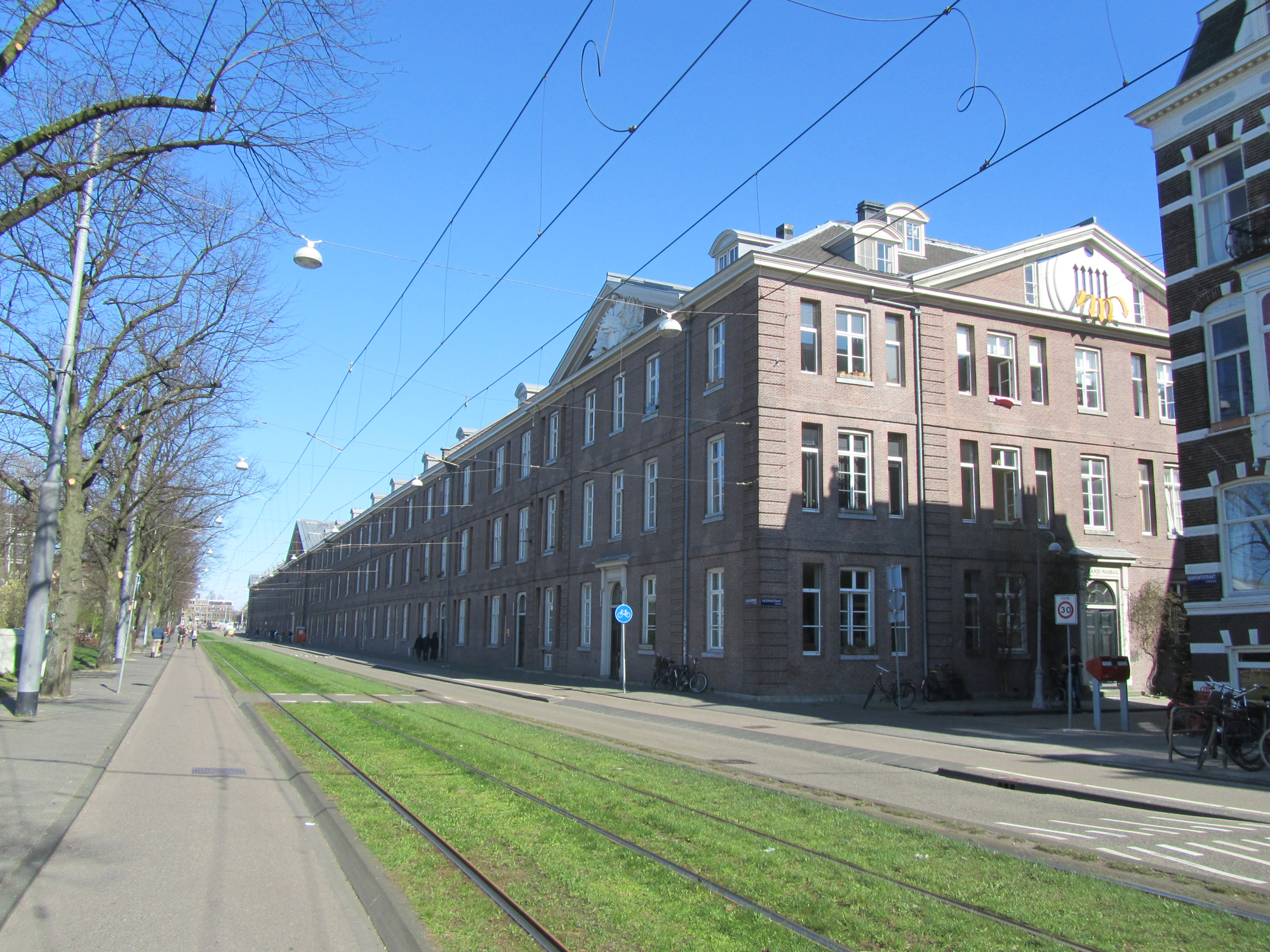
- Northern and western facade
- Interactive map of the Oranje-Nassau Kazerne area

General information
- Type: Military barracks
- Architectural style: Neoclassical architecture
- Location: Sarphatistraat 600, Amsterdam, Netherlands
- Coordinates: 52°21′53″N 4°55′17″E
- Groundbreaking: 1810
- Opened: 1813

Design and construction
- Architects: Abraham van der Hart, Picot de Maras

Website
- www.oranjenassaukazerne.com

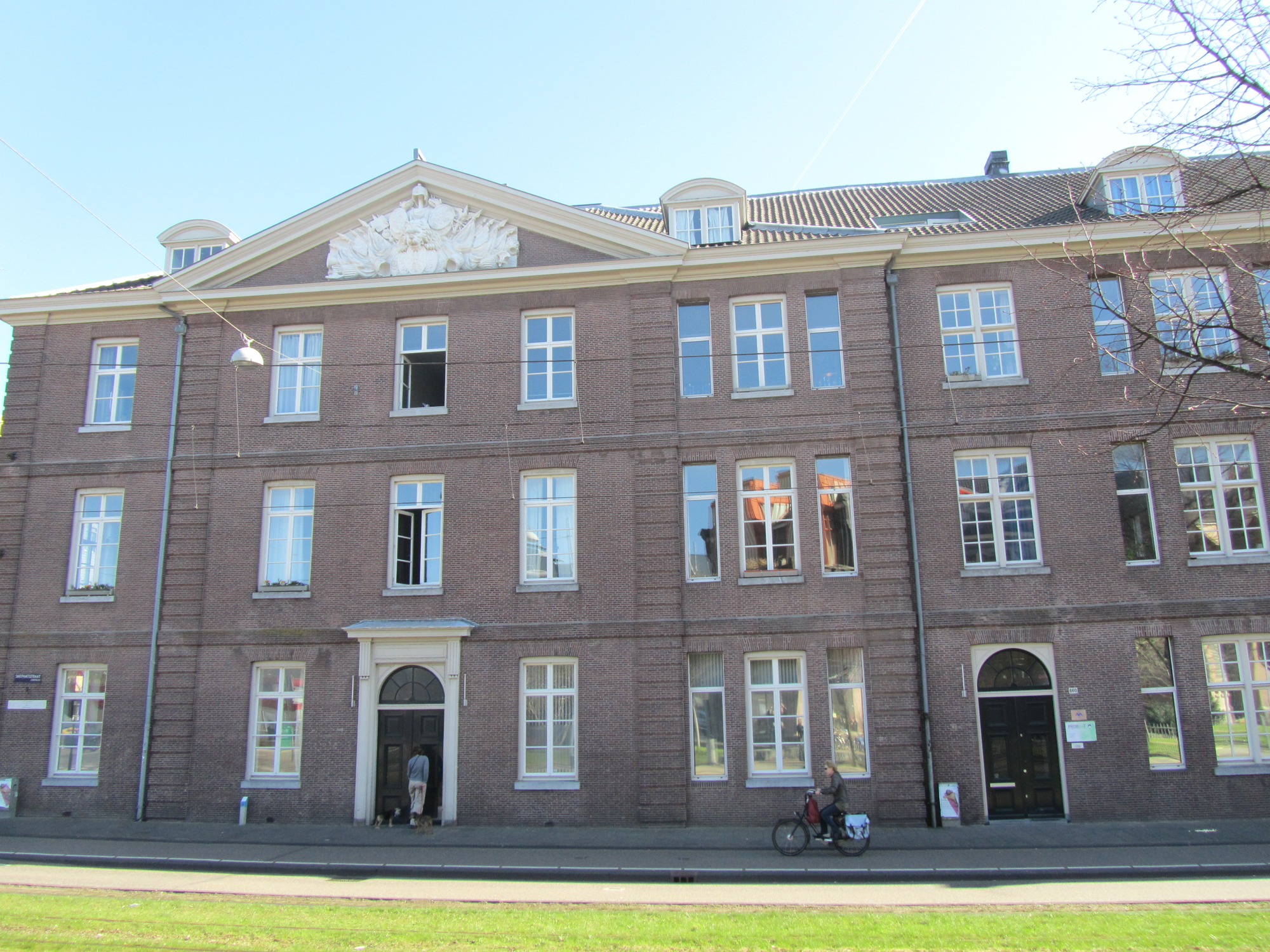
Oranje-Nassau Kazerne, northern facade

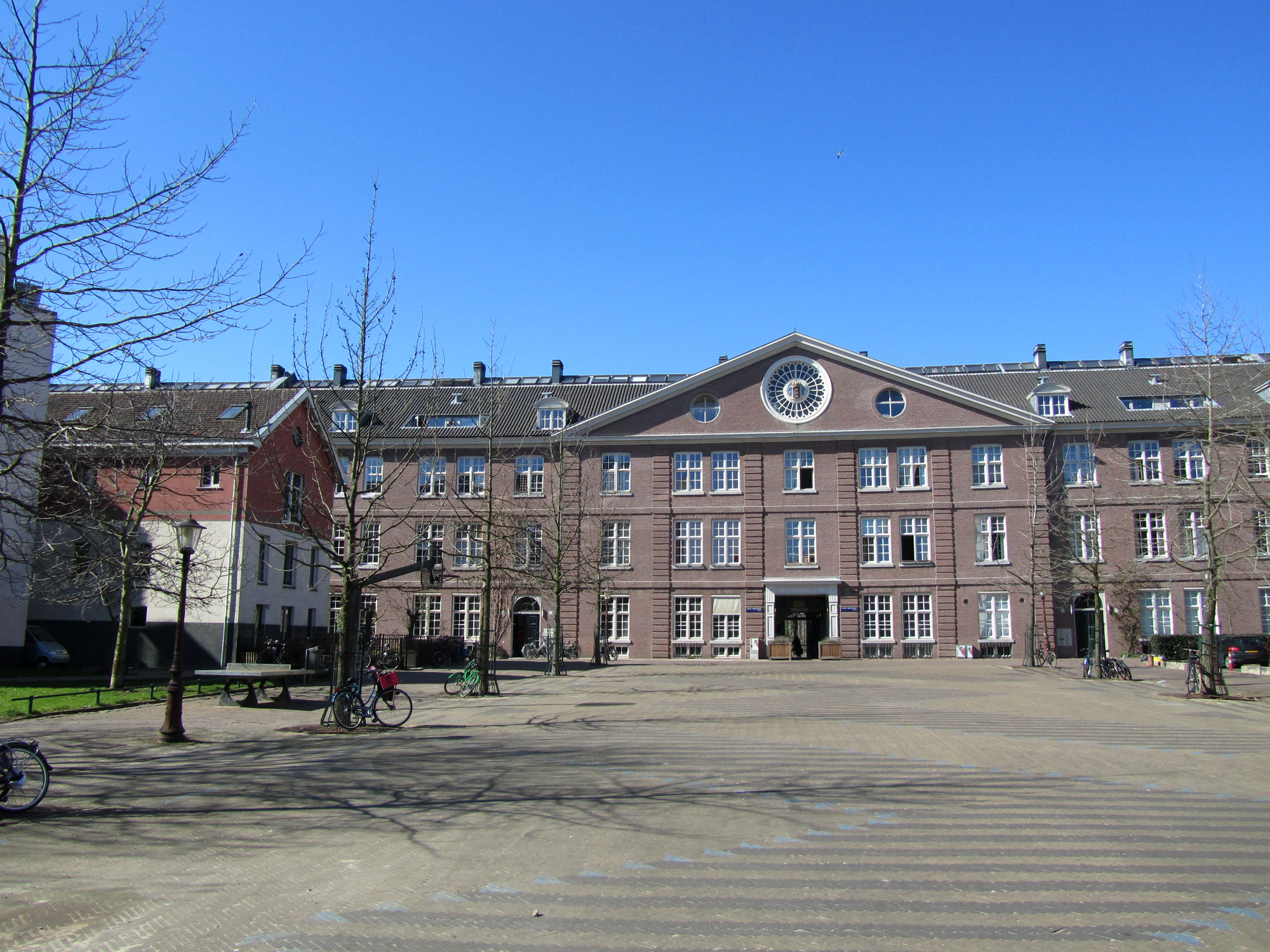
Oranje-Nassau Kazerne, southern facade with underpass

The Oranje-Nassau Kazerne is a former military barracks in the centre of Amsterdam, along the Singelgracht canal, directly south of Artis zoo. Emperor Napoleon ordered the construction of this early 19th-century neoclassical building. Not long after construction of the building was complete in 1813, the French withdrew from the Netherlands, and the building was named in honour of the House of Orange-Nassau.

The building received rijksmonument status in 1970. In the 1980s, the barracks were converted to a complex of apartments and offices.

== Description ==
The building has a façade stretching uninterrupted for a length of 278 metres. Halfway along the façade is a large pediment with the coat of arms of the House of Orange-Nassau. The building is 16 metres wide, with walls measuring 50 centimetres thick. A total of 3,300 piles were used for the foundation. During the renovation in the late 1980s, six eight-storey apartment buildings were constructed on the former parade ground. Each of these buildings were designed by a different team of architects and are named after the surrounding streets and squares (Sarphatistraat, Kazernestraat, Louise Wentstraat, Ir. Jakoba Mulderplein). During the 1980s renovation, an underpass was added to the building. Only two other buildings in the barracks compound have survived: the kitchen building and the office building.

== History ==
=== Barracks ===
The Oranje-Nassau Kazerne is the largest of a series of military buildings along the Singelgracht canal. These buildings, on either side of the Muiderpoort city gate, were constructed in the course of the 19th century along the city walls protecting the eastern side of the city. The buildings were part of the Hollandse Waterlinie, a defensive line around Amsterdam to protect the city from foreign invaders. The Oranje-Nassau Kazerne was built in the years 1810-1813 between the 17th-century bastions Outewaal and Oosterbeer to house the city's infantry garrison and the troops manning the defenses around the city. The windmill De Gooyer on the bastion Oosterbeer had to be moved because the barracks took away too much wind. In 1814, it was moved to nearby Funenkade.

The barracks were built during the Napoleonic era. After the Netherlands were annexed by Napoleon's French Empire, Napoleon ordered the construction of a large building that could not only house 2,400 garrison troops, but would also be imposing enough to express the magnificence of his empire to the citizens of Amsterdam. In 1810, Marshall Oudinot laid the first stone for the barracks, originally called the Quartier Saint-Charles. The design by the city architect Abraham van der Hart and the French artillery officer Picot de Maras was based on the Vauban barracks, which had no corridors; instead the soldiers' living quarters could be reached only through internal doors and staircases. The city was obliged to pay for the construction of the building. The costs amounted to 58,000 guilders for the purchase of the terrain and to pay damages to two millers, plus 701,888 guilders for the construction itself — a massive amount of money in those days. Every citizen of Amsterdam was ordered to pay 5% of the rental worth of his house. Those who refused to pay, had to give room and board to French soldiers instead.

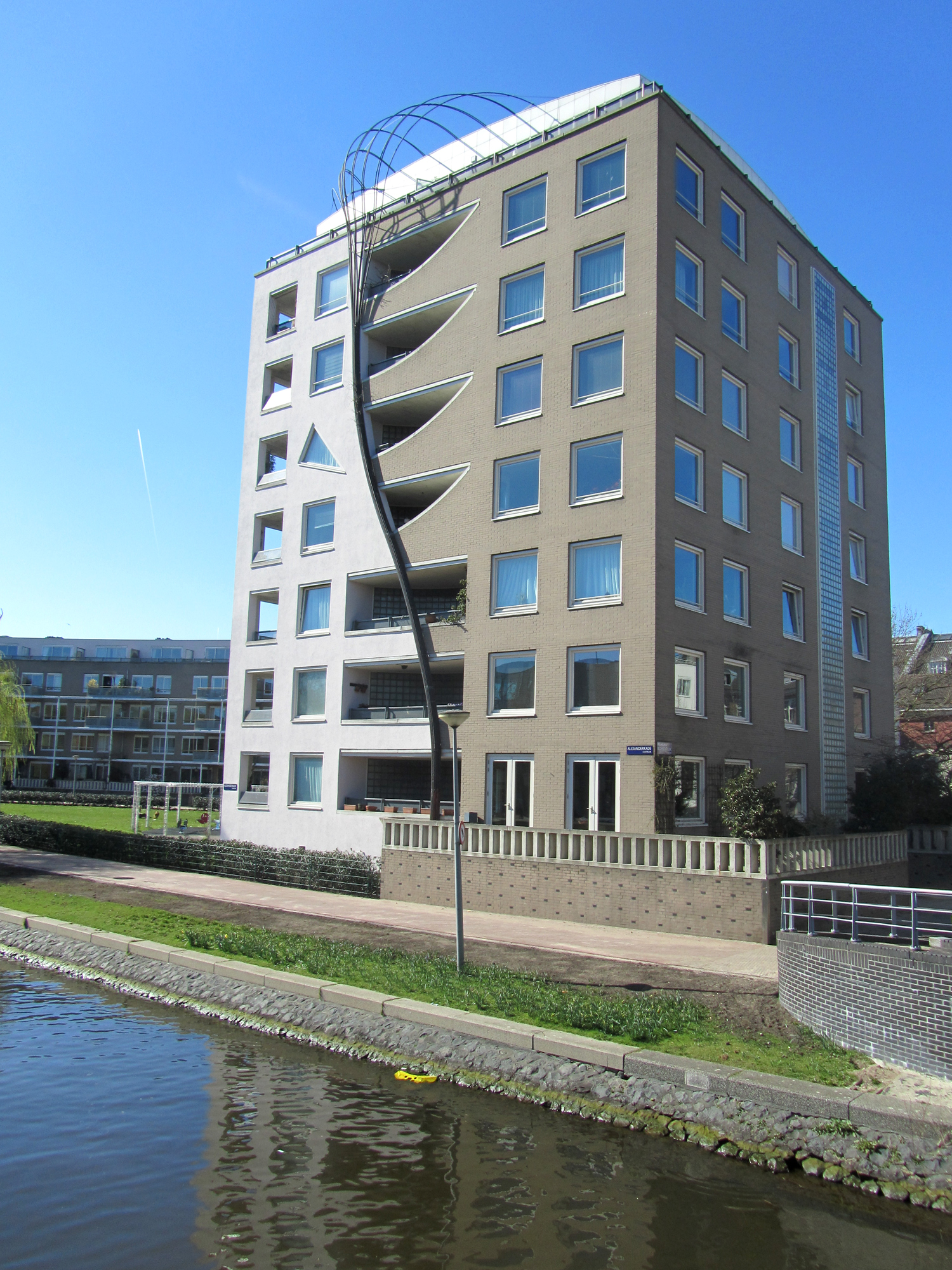
Oranje-Nassau Kazerne toren 1, a new building on the former barracks compound

In 1813 the barracks were complete. However, not long after, the French withdrew from the Netherlands. The building was renamed Oranje-Nassau Kazerne, after the House of Orange-Nassau which in 1814 became the royal house of the Netherlands. The coat of arms of Napoleon on the central pediment of the building was replaced with the coat of arms of the House of Orange-Nassau. On the pediments on the two sides of the buildings, the French eagle was replaced with the Dutch lion.

The barracks were subsequently used to house the Dutch 7th Infantry Regiment, but the building was found to be too humid and drafty, and in 1830 it was declared unsuitable for housing. From 1839, it was used to house animals from the adjacent Artis zoo. Around 1860, the Dutch national government took over the building from the city. It was used to store artillery and military vehicles and, from 1892, to house the carrier pigeons of the military carrier pigeon service (Militaire Postduivendienst, later renamed Rijkspostduivenstation). During the 20th century, the building again served as barracks for infantry troops. This was also where the young men of Amsterdam who were called up for military service underwent their physical examinations.

=== Apartment and office building ===
The building received rijksmonument status in 1970. It was used as a barracks until 1987, when the last troops left the building. Plans were made to demolish the building, which had an unstable foundation that was estimated to cost 5 million guilders to restore. Following protests from local residents and the historic preservation society Monumentenzorg, new plans were presented to restore the building and convert it to apartments and offices. Architects from six countries worked together in the middle of 1988 under the coordination of Atelier PRO to create a new design based on six apartment towers. In 1989, the building was handed back to the city by the Dutch government, and about 150 government-funded rental apartments were constructed in the building. Additional windows were added in order to bring more light into the building. Also, some 3000 m^{2} of office space was created on the ground floor and in the basement. In 1990, the first apartments were complete.
