= De Gooyer, Amsterdam =

Windmill in Amsterdam

The Gooyer
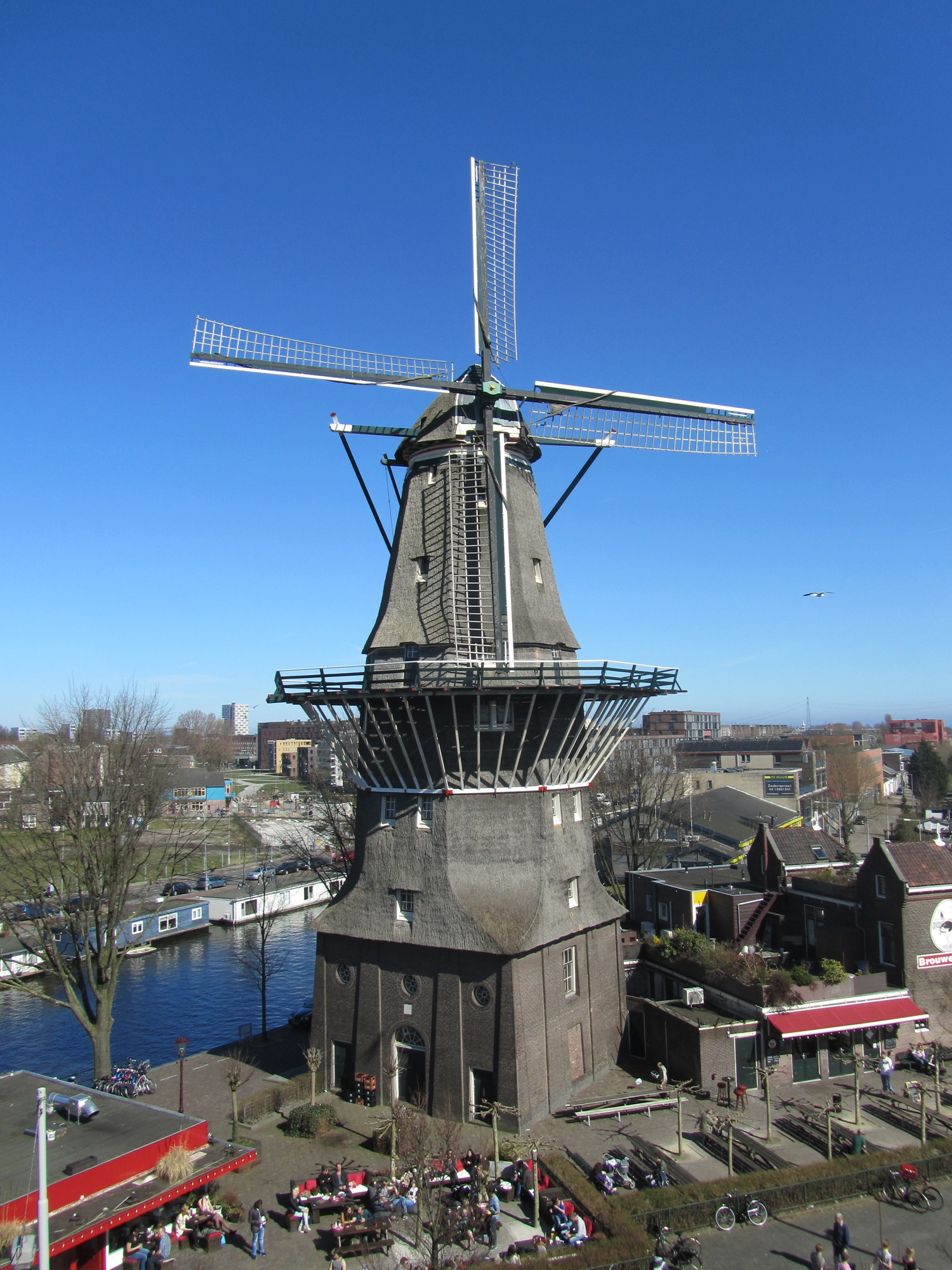
- Interactive map of The Gooyer

Origin
- Mill location: Amsterdam
- Coordinates: 52°22′00″N 4°55′34″E
- Year built: 1814

Information
- Purpose: Previously grinding grain
- Smock sides: Eight sides
- No. of sails: Four sails

De Gooyer is a windmill in Amsterdam located between Funenkade and Zeeburgerstraat. It is the tallest wooden mill in the Netherlands at 26.6 meters high. It is registered as a National Monument.

The name dates from around 1609, when the mill was owned by Claes and Jan Willemsz, two brothers from Gooiland. It is also known as "The Funenmolen" ("The Mill on the Funen").

The Gooyer consists of a stone foundation topped by a wooden octagonal body. The mill is owned by the municipality of Amsterdam and is not open to visitors. Although the blades are functional, they no longer operate any grinding mechanism.

Next to the mill, in the former municipal bathhouse dating back to 1911, is the Brouwerij 't IJ. The mill and the bathhouse building are unrelated, and the mill fulfils no function for the brewery despite the image of a mill being in the brewery logo.

== History ==
The original mill was constructed in the 16th century. After destruction and some movements, in 1725 the mill stood on the site of the current Orange-Nassau barracks. Finally, in 1814 the mill moved again to its current location on Funenkade atop the stone base of a watermill that had been demolished in 1812.

This mill is the last of 26 corn mills on the bastions of the 17th century walls of Amsterdam. The location of the mills was at that time very favourable as the outskirts of town provided ample wind.

After the mill had fallen into disrepair, it was purchased in 1928 by the city of Amsterdam for 3200 guilders and restored. Due to the lack of power during the Second World War the mill served as a corn mill for Amsterdam. The sails were damaged on November 13, 1972 during a storm. The upper shaft broke and the blades embedded in the adjacent Nieuwevaart. Some years later the original, old Dutch type blades were restored.

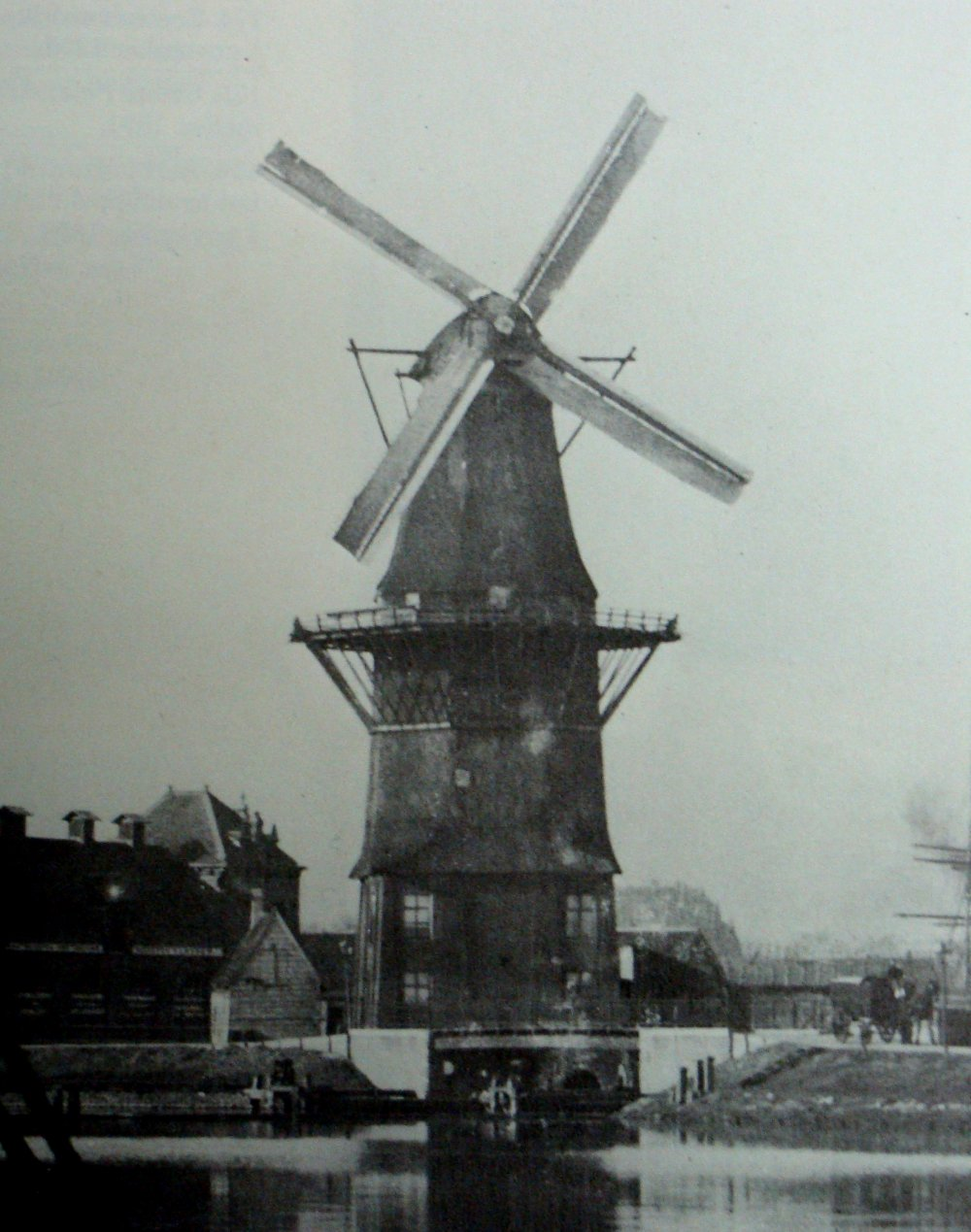
The mill in 1896, photographed by Jacob Olie

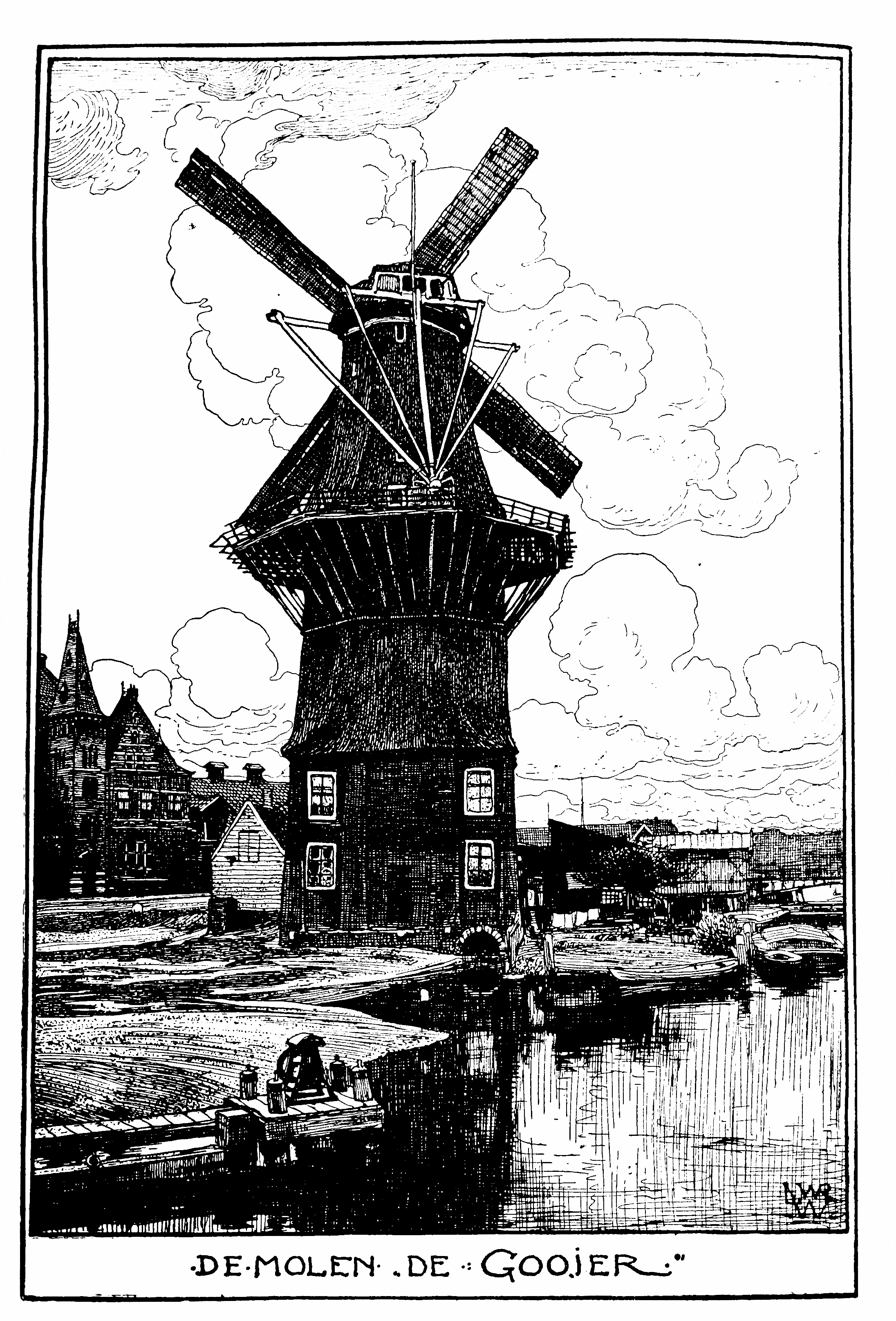
The mill around 1900, signed by Willem Wenckebach
