= Leidsepoort =

Former city gate in Amsterdam, the Netherlands

Coordinates: 52.364242°N 4.882978°E

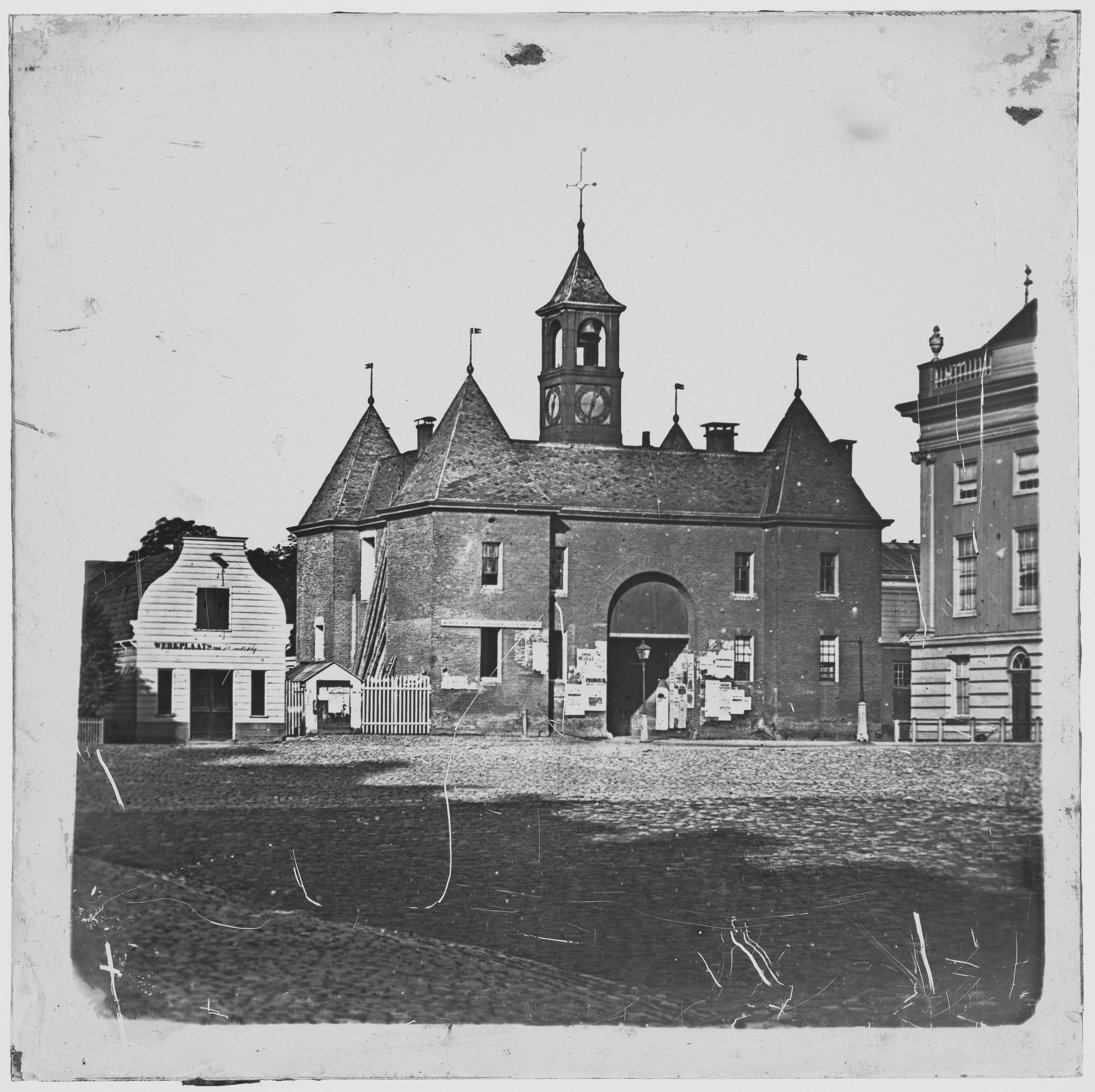

The Leidsepoort is a former city gate in Amsterdam, the Netherlands, located on what today is Leidseplein square.

It was built in 1664 after a design by the city architect Daniël Stalpaert in 1664. It was torn down for traffic purposes in 1862.
