= Lastage =

Coordinates: 52.373084°N 4.903207°E

- Neighbourhood of Amsterdam
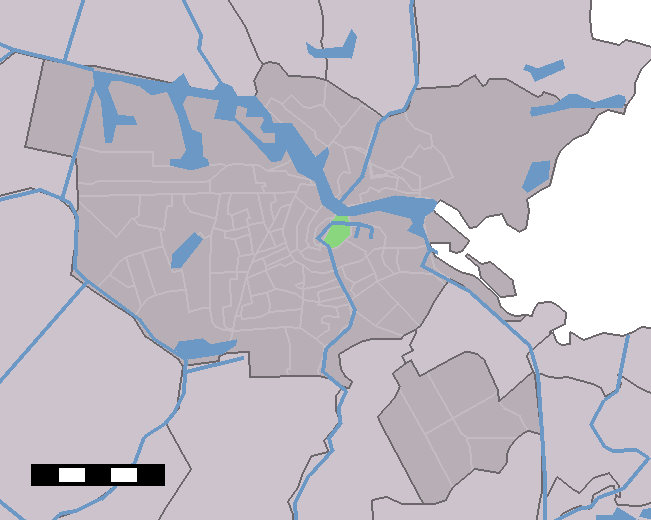
- Country: Netherlands
- Province: North Holland
- COROP: Amsterdam
- Borough: Centrum
- Time zone: UTC+1 (CET)

Lastage is a neighborhood in the Centrum borough of Amsterdam, Netherlands. It is located between the Geldersekade and Oudeschans canals, and north of Sint Antoniesbreestraat, just east of old medieval city, and developed as the city's first maritime industrial quarter.

== Boundaries ==
For statistical purposes, the city defines the neighborhood (buurt) as a smaller area than the historical one, being bound by the Geldersekade to the west, the Rechtboomssloot to the southwest, the Oudeschans to the east, the Waalseilandsgracht and the Prins Hendrikkade to the north.

The neighbourhood is part of the larger statistical district (wijk) named Nieuwmarkt/Lastage, centered on Nieuwmarkt Square; it is protected as a heritage site. This district is bounded by the Kloveniersburgwal and Gelderskade to the west, the Binnen-Amstel to the south, the Nieuwe Herengracht to the east, and the IJ to the north.

== History ==
The oldest historical record of the use of the Lastage dates from 1404. The city then gave Ysebrant Pietersz permission to settle with his family in the marshy land east of the city and to erect a house with a ropewalk here.

In the 16th century, lastage developed into an industrial and port area of Amsterdam. Halfway through the 16th century, five ropewalks, some ship's mast factories, and a few shipyards for the caulking and repairing of ships were established here. Due to the location of the area outside the city wall, taxes were much lower and spatial planning regulations were much less strict. The adjacent bend in the IJ inlet called Waal was shallow, which, although unsuitable for merchant vessels, was ideal for docking ships in winter.

During the Guelderian Wars, the area came under threat several times by the troops of Charles of Guelders. When the nearby towns of Weesp and Muiden came under Charles' occupation in the spring of 1508, the city of Amsterdam burnt the area down as a precautionary measure. In December 1512, it was burnt down again, this time at the hands of the Guelders troops.

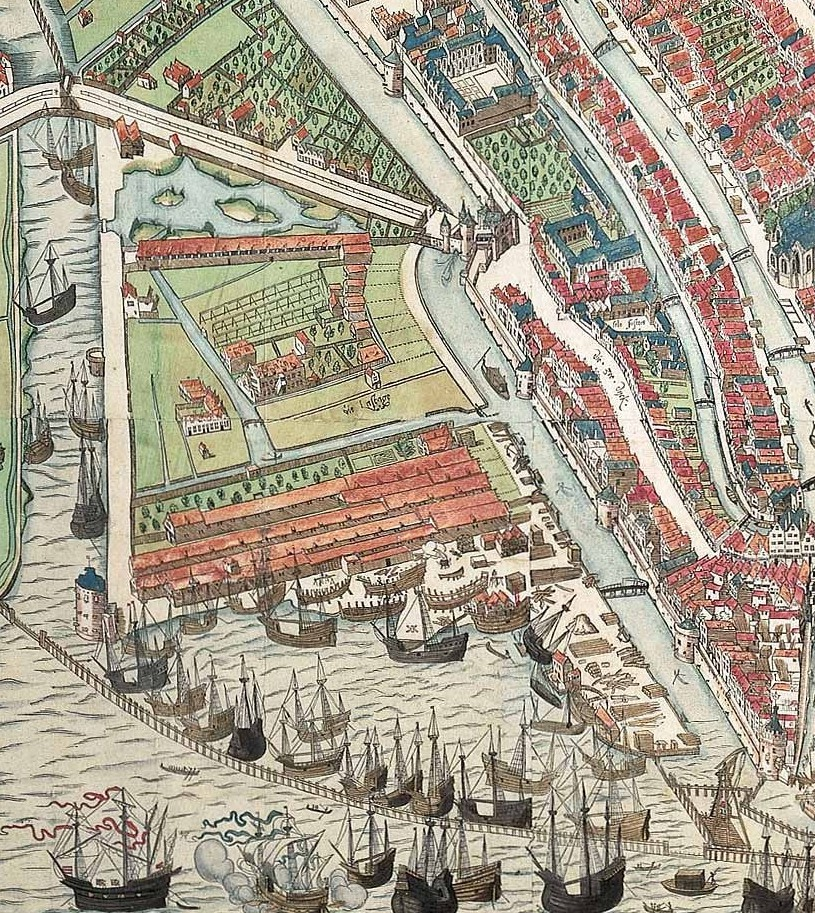
Detail of a woodcut from 1544 by Cornelis Anthonisz. showing the Lastage area, with Oudeschans on the left and Geldersekade on the right.

The name Lastage derives from the various ship's ballast-related activities that took place here (ballasten, ontlasten and belasten). Near the Schreierstoren on the quay along the IJ, a crane was built to lift cargo, masts and anchors. A ditch was dug between Montelbaansgracht (now Oudeschans) and Geldersekade around 1530, and was named Rechtboomssloot after Cornelis P. Boom, one of the landowners in the area. The old stream that ran through the Lastage was named Kromboomssloot. Local residents' proposals in 1543 and 1548 to incorporate Lastage into the city were not accepted, despite efforts made by a delegation sent to the Great Council of Mechelen, who brought along a painting of the area by Cornelis Anthonisz. illustrating the local situation. In 1550 there were already 550 houses outside the city walls. In 1564, the residents, backed by the vogt, urged the city government once more to expand the city. Due to the activities in the area posing a potential fire hazard, the city government denied the plea again.

=== Revolt and war ===
When the Dutch Revolt broke out in 1566, and the Duke of Alba instituted the Council of Troubles, several of the landowners in the area fled the city and moved abroad. They would return again in 1578 with new insights and trade contacts in the Baltic Sea area.

Immediately after the Alteration (the change of power from a Catholic to a Protestant city council), when Amsterdam finally joined the revolt led by William of Orange against Spain, the new mayors, among whom were some of the landowners on Lastage, made plans for the area and for the expansion and renovation of the port. When a ban on building activities was declared in 1579, the city council wanted to expropriate the land in Lastage, a proposal deemed unacceptable by the local landowners. On the other hand, the high land value made it unacceptable for the city council to consider buying the land instead. In the following years a number of landowners agreed to an estimated value determined by a committee. Two owners, namely the rope maker Claes Burchmansz. Dob and Robrecht Cools, refused and were taken to court. The proceedings were taken all the way up to the highest body, the Court of Holland. The city council was by now in a hurry to make the area more defensible against attacks, especially after Antwerp had fallen and there was a serious risk that the Duke of Parma would advance north towards Amsterdam. Dob and Cools were eventually forced to agree and cooperate, and hastily a defensive rampart was erected, known today as Oudeschans.

=== The amelioration ===
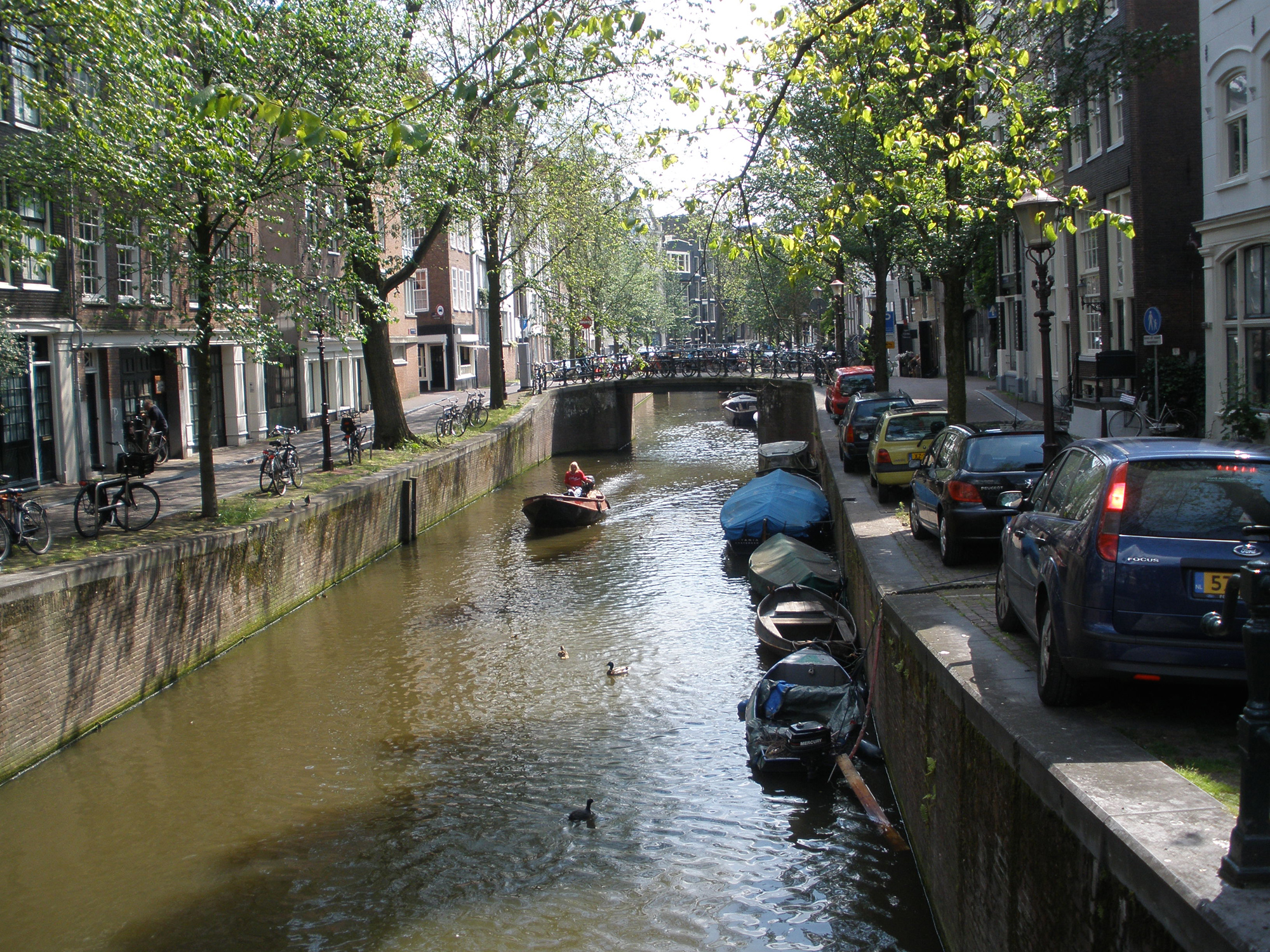
Kromboomssloot

In around 1586, the city started drawing up plans for the layout of the streets, alleys and defensive walls. Local landowners were required to demolish existing buildings, such as drying sheds, tar houses, fences and ropewalks, and to raise the land with sand. The city provided the sand and stone needed for pavements and embankments. In return for this "amelioration", the landowners were required to pay a tax, the amount of which was to be determined later. The ban on construction, which had been introduced eight years earlier, was then lifted. Before any building work was allowed, however, the amelioration tax had to be set for each plot of land. To do this, the plots were measured to calculate the loss of land to newly built streets, ditches and ramparts.

It was not until 1589 that the plots south of the Rechtboomssloot, which the city had already purchased and raised, began to be built on. Building activities then spread eastward from there. At the Oudeschans rampart, a high bridge was built to the island of Uilenburg. This island became part of a second expansion that was intended to accommodate the now flourishing and rapidly expanding shipbuilding industry. This expansion was intended to allow the shipyards and mast makers to be relocated, enabling other parts of Lastage to be reorganized. In January 1595, blacksmiths were banned from Lastage due to the fire hazard and the smell and noise they produced, and they relocated to the northern part of the island of Uilenburg.

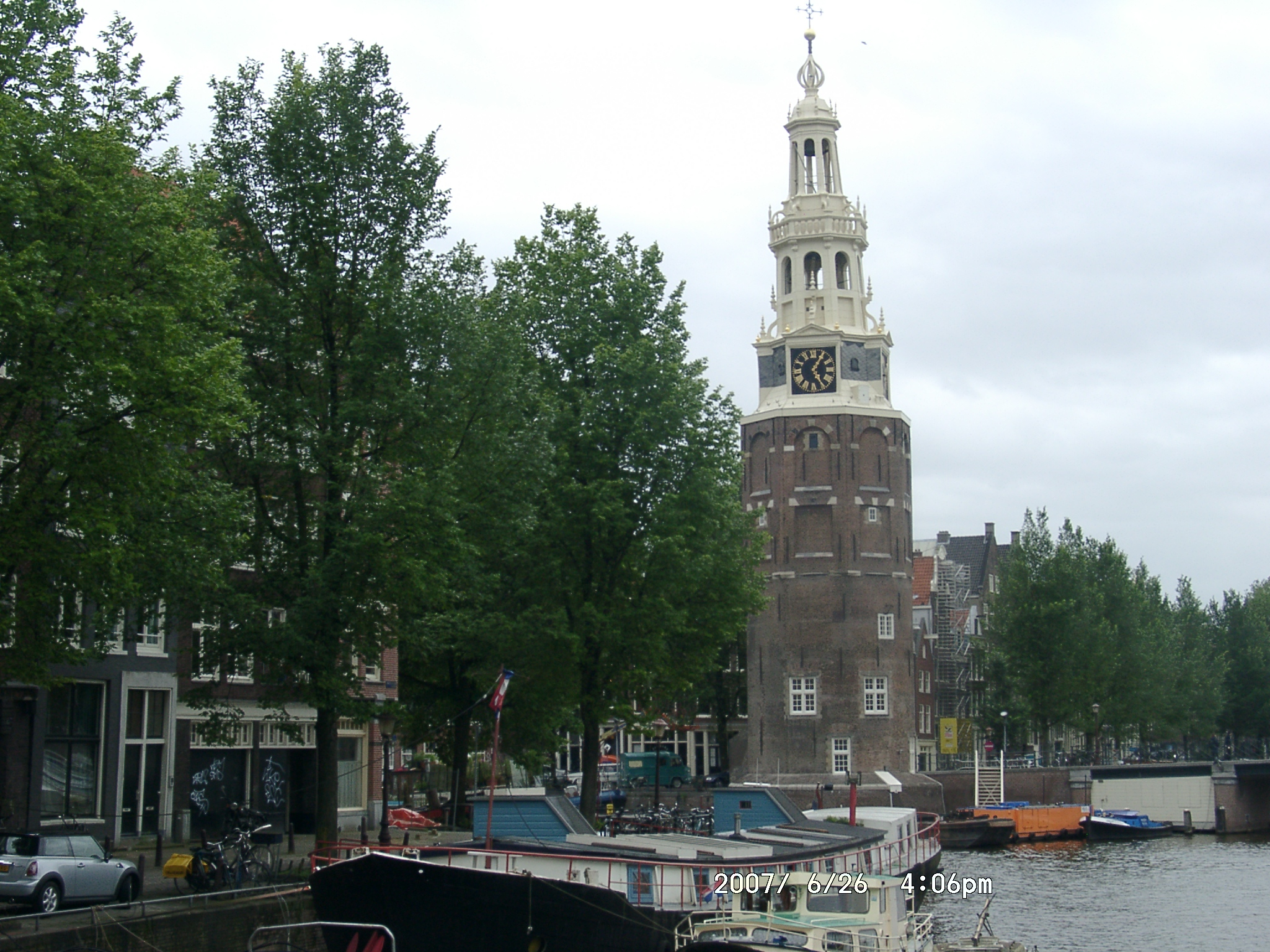
Oudeschans with the Montelbaanstoren

=== Crisis and controversy ===
Due to a severe economic crisis, plot sales came to a complete standstill in around 1596, as is apparent from the city's register of lots offered for sale at public auctions.

New disputes arose when the city surveyor Adriaen Ockersz. proposed a new cost-distribution plan, called Repartition. The renewal of the Waal, which was the city's harbour at that time, and the straightening of the banks had already been completed by then. Many owners objected to the valuations calculated, including Cleyn Ceesje, a mast maker on the Kromme Waal, who appealed against a calculation error. The surveyor, a former locksmith, was alleged to have a poor head for figures and had also made serious errors when calculating the size of the body of water between Uilenburg and Marken.

To the dismay of landowners, eight years of accumulated interest had to be paid. The owners were particularly irritated by charges for the cost of the timberwork and paving, as residents living within the old city walls did not have to pay separate taxes for those items. The mayors responded by trying to convince the landowners that paving was extremely important to prevent fires: Delft, Haarlem and Leiden were given as examples. Concerns about fire were much in people's minds that year, because 26 houses had burned down in Warmoesstraat and 33 in Sint Antoniesbreestraat, while several warehouses full of valuable Muscovy goods. had also been lost on Geldersekade.

=== Moving ahead ===
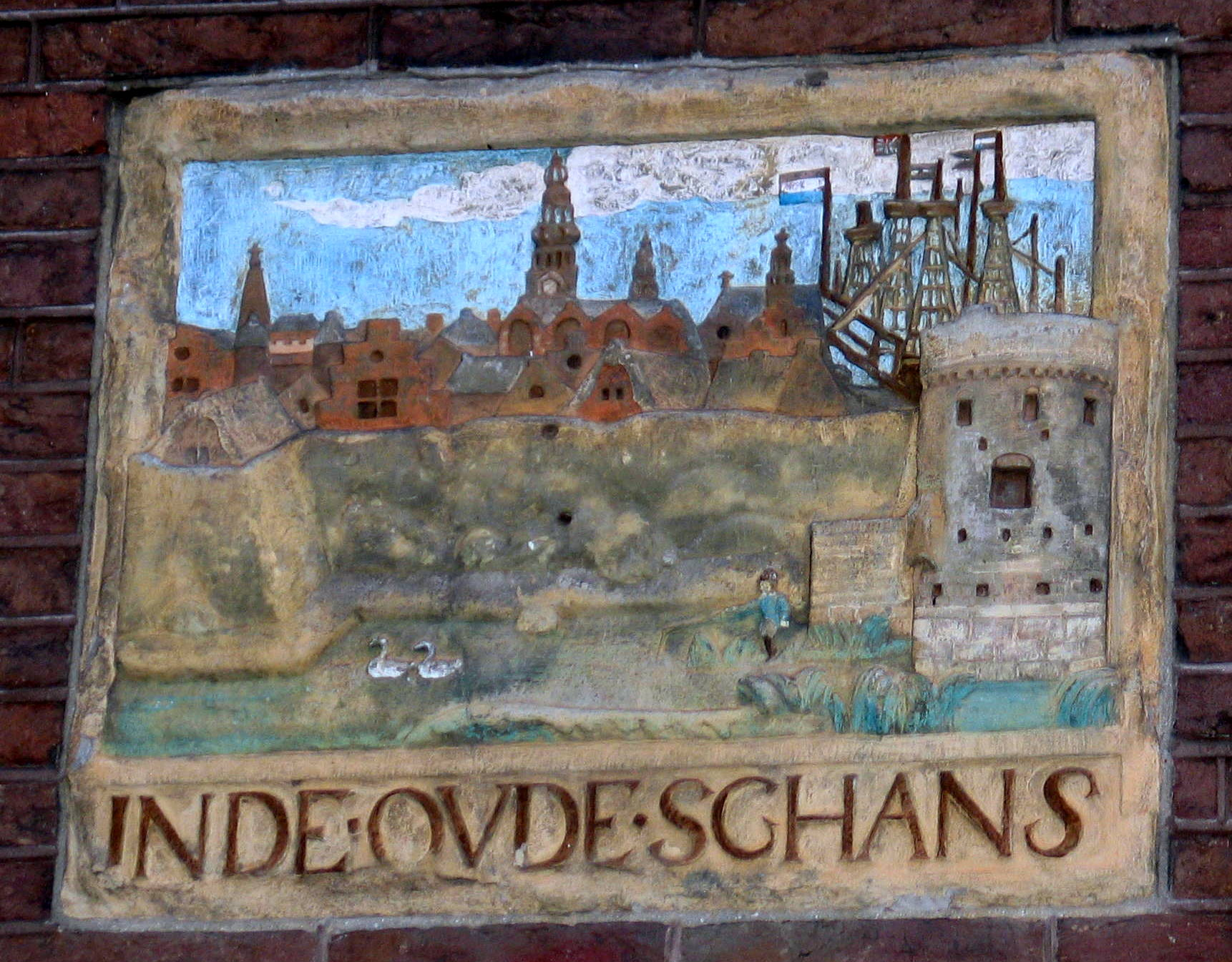
Gable stone in a wall of the Amsterdam Museum

In February 1598, after the bankruptcy of the Doesburg brothers, and court proceedings that lasted up to the Court of Holland, the last two ropeworks were demolished. Work then began on Jonkerstraat and Bantammerstraat. By this time, rents in the old city had already increased at an alarming rate, to almost double the amount. Subsequently, construction activity also spread out north and west.

To finance site preparation for the two largest plots in the Lastage, so-called "producers" were used. These were, among others, mayor's daughter Jannetje Pelgrom, her fourth husband (John or Hans Vanderbeke), and Jan de Wael, a mayor and brewer from Haarlem and brother of Pelgrom's first husband. They were essentially developers, possibly in cooperation with the city council. Two other major speculators or land owners were Syvert P. Sem, governor of the Compagnie van Verre and French Hendricksz. Oetgens, who was in charge of urban development and public works.

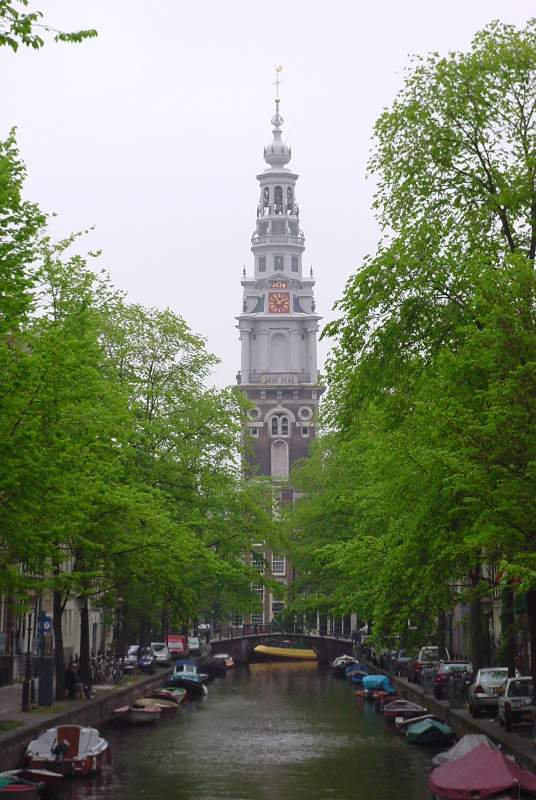
Zuiderkerk, seen from the same angle Claude Monet's famous painting

In 1601 the city government proposed a new appraisal for the Lastage. The proposal took into account the location of the land, which had increased in value, and the losses sustained from upgrading the area. The proposal was rejected by the landowners because it still required interest payments. It took until 1604 before a final, favourable decision was reached. After seven years of struggles between landowners, city council, and the courts, the amount of amelioration was reduced by 30%. The proceeds of over 10,000 guilders were given to the poor and that same year, at the request of the citizens in the area, work started on building a bridge to the Schreierstoren.

=== Completion ===
The expansion of Lastage had taken longer than has been assumed by historians for a long time, on the authority of Tobias van Domselaer (1611–1685), a poet and chronicler. Van Domselaer believed that the First Expansion had already been completed in 1593 and described Lastage as an overcrowded slum. In reality, the expansion on Lastage had taken at least fifteen years to complete, from 1589 to 1604. Only on plots owned by the city or the mayors could building commence immediately. The ropers, timber merchants, mast makers and shipwrights, supported by former mayor C.P. Hooft, who would regularly and vigorously defend their case in city council sessions, had all resisted giving up their conveniently located land between the city and the port, if it meant having to relocate at a high cost to Uilenburg or Rapenburg.

=== Nieuwmarkt ===
Due to the expansion of the city, the city gate known as Sint Antoniespoort had lost its function. The gate was re-purposed to be used as a stock exchange, a weigh house, and as a guildhall. By partially filling in the canal in front of the gate, a new market square was created, which was to become Nieuwmarkt.

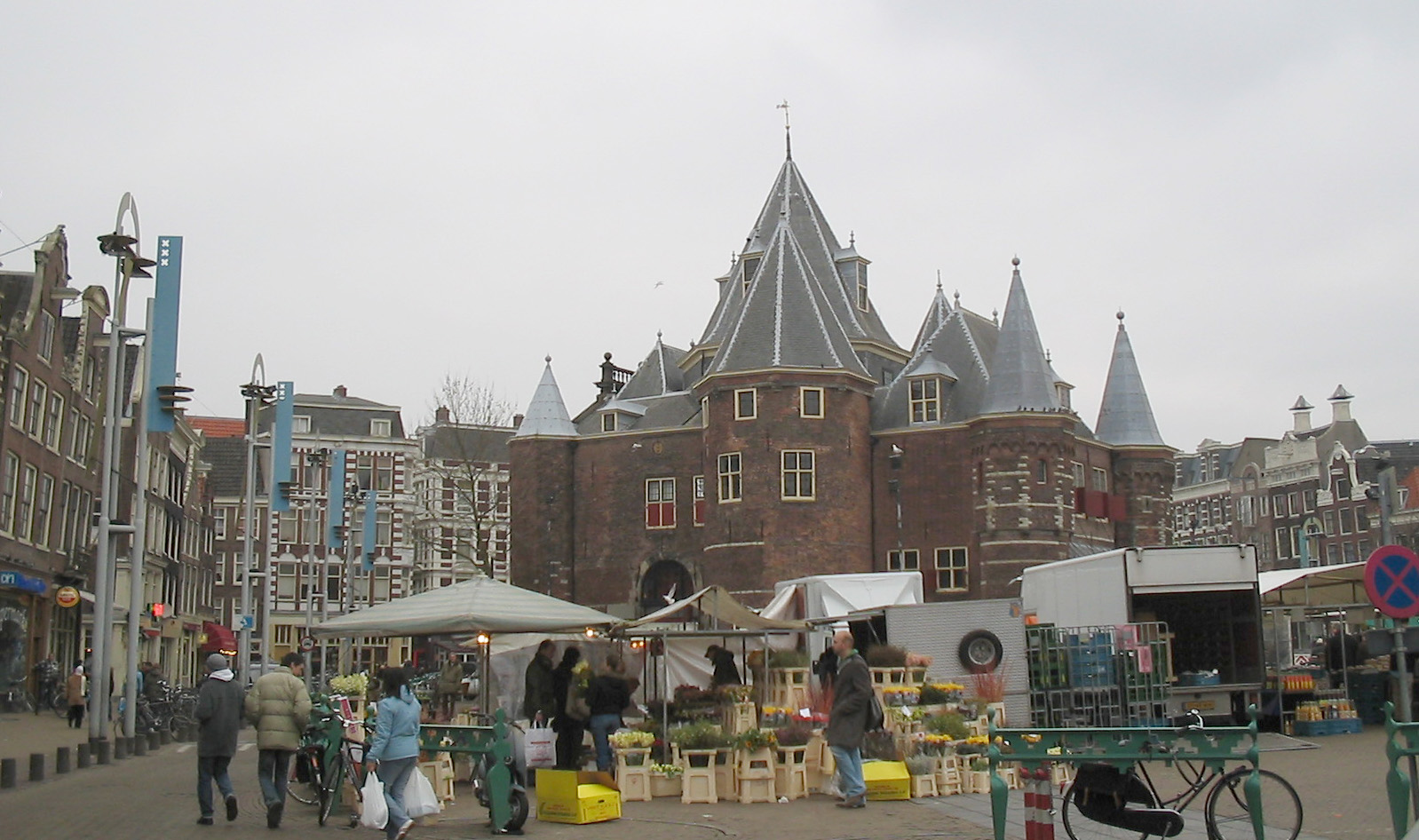
Nieuwmarkt with the old city gate, now called Waag

The neighbourhood didn't change much for the next few centuries. With the settlement of Sephardi and Ashkenazi Jews in the adjacent neighbourhoods, some areas of Lastage became part of the Jewish Quarter. After the Nazi occupation of World War II, many of the area's residents had relocated or been deported and large parts of the neighbourhood had fallen into disrepair.

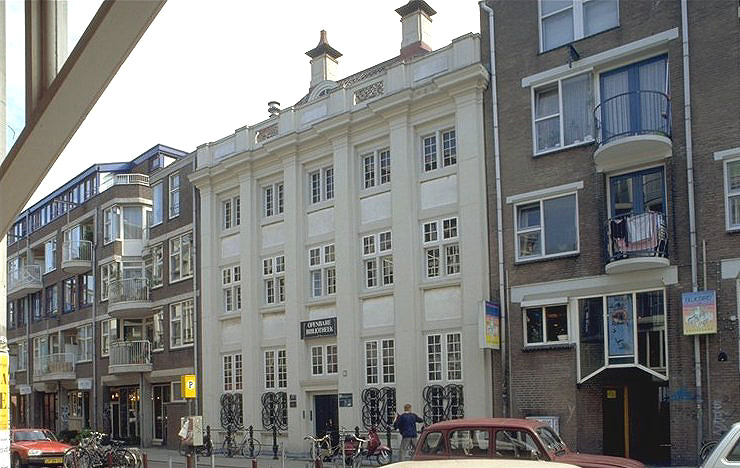
De Pinto House

In the 1960s, as part of the 1953 Post-war Reconstruction Plan, the city council planned for a traffic thoroughfare and a metro line to be built through the Lastage area. Under the leadership of Geurt Brinkgreve, an activist for the protection of cultural heritage, campaigning took place between 1967 and 1975 for the conservation of the monumental De Pinto House, which was situated directly on the planned route. Activists from the kraakbeweging (squatters' movement) managed to maintain the property well, in conjunction with the De Pinto Foundation, newly established in 1971 at the initiative of Brinkgreve. By conserving this strategically located building, the construction of the controversial dual carriageway road was effectively blocked. On January 5, 1972 city council decided to abandon the project. The De Pinto Foundation successfully restored the heavily neglected house in 1974–1975.

In addition to the road plan, many planned office buildings were scrapped as well, in favour of homes. Between 1975 and 1984, new residential developments arose around the Pinto House. The eastern line of the new Amsterdam Metro did go ahead as planned, and the method used to construct the metro tunnels required whole city blocks to be demolished. On March 24 and April 8, 1975, riots erupted over the demolition of homes that were still in good condition.

Today, Lastage is a popular neighbourhood due to its relative tranquillity in the midst of a lively, central location in the city. Lastage borders Chinatown, De Wallen, the Waterlooplein area and is located near Centraal Station.

== Listed buildings and architecture ==
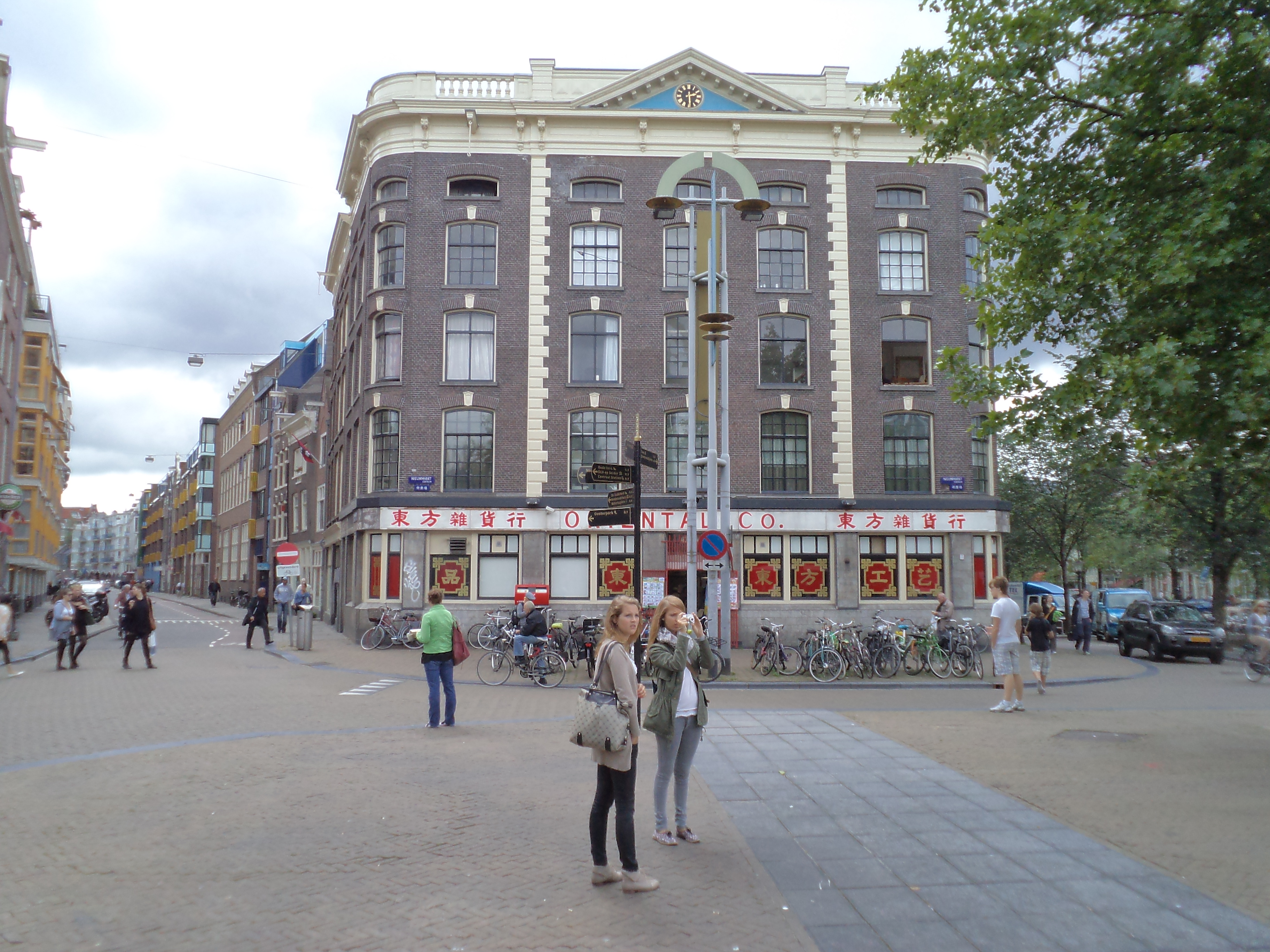
"House with the Clock", formerly a bank, now a Chinese supermarket

Notable examples:

- Montelbaanstoren (1516), Oudeschans 2
- Zuiderkerk (1603–1614), Zuiderkerkhof 72
- Huis De Pinto (1680), Sint Antoniesbreestraat 69
- "The House with the Clock" (19th century), Sint Antoniesbreestraat 2
- Scheepvaarthuis (phase I - 1916; phase II - 1928), Prins Hendrikkade 108

Further reading: Complete list of listed buildings in Lastage (in Dutch)
