= Alicante Innovation and Territory =

Spanish strategic plan

Innovation + Territory Programme. Province of Alicante
- Authors: Alfonso Vegara (team leader)
- Language: Spanish / English
- Subject: Strategic planning
- Genre: non-fiction
- Publisher: Alicante Provincial Council, CAM
- Publication date: January 2009
- Publication place: Spain, E.U.
- Media type: Paperback
- Pages: 392

Alicante Innovation + Territory is a strategic plan for the Province of Alicante, Spain (Southern Europe).

It initiated from the collaboration agreement signed in 2007 by Alicante Provincial Council (Diputación Provincial de Alicante) and the savings bank CAM -as strategic partners- with the Foundation Metrópoli -knowledge partner-.

A team led by the president of Metropoli Foundation, the architect Alfonso Vegara, who was President of ISOCARP (2002–05) and received the "European City and Regional Planning Award" of ECTP-CEU in 2006, conducted an analytical report that contains a wide range of solutions for the province of Alicante. They were inspired in the philosophy of the "Smart Places" and as result of a selection of its proposals Province of Alicante Innovation + Territory Programme was released, financed and offered to the civil society by the strategic partners for free.

- The aim of this strategic plan is to promote the development of the towns in Alicante Province in order to make it more competitive and sustainable. Alicante I + T Programme considers territorial transformation as the keystone in an economic development process based on innovation and knowledge.
- The focus is to facilitate the adaptation of the territory and their economic activities to the new challenges of the future, involving in the process the civil society as well as the public and private sectors.
- The tools with which to carry out the strategic proposals for each of the functional areas are the "Zero Agencies" (business incubator) and the Clusters.

Alicante I+T Programme is based in the "European Spatial Development Perspective" and the European Commission's Communication "Putting knowledge into practice: a broad-based innovation strategy for the EU” to the Council, the Parliament, the Economic and Social Committee, and the Committee of the Regions, as well as the "Europe Innova Initiative" under the 6th Framework Programme.

In April 2009 a group of representatives of the Architectural Association in London visited Alicante in order to understand the programme Alicante Innovation + Territory.

This project was promoted from Suma Gestión Tributaria, which is the public provincial body that manages mainly property tax and cartography, forming part of Alicante Provincial Council during 2010. Nowadays, finished its promotion, Alicante Innovation + Territory is in the area of Local Development of that Provincial Council.

== See also ==
- Competitive advantage
- Glocalization
- Community building
- Framework Programmes for Research and Technological Development
