= Commins =

Commins may refer to

- Commins, Denbighshire, a village in Wales
- Commins Coch, a village in Powys, Wales
- Commins (surname)

== See also ==
- Commin
- Comins (disambiguation)
