= Alicante (disambiguation) =

Alicante is a city and port in Spain on the Costa Blanca, the capital of the province of Alicante and of the comarca of Alacantí.

Alicante may also refer to:

== Places ==
- Province of Alicante, Spain
  - Alicante–Elche Miguel Hernández Airport
  - University of Alicante
- Alicante (DO), a wine region in Spain

== Sport ==
- Alicante CF, a Spanish football club

== Plants ==
- Alicante Bouschet, a grape variety cross of Petit Bouschet and Grenache
- Alicante Ganzin, a red French wine grape variety
- Alicante tomato, a medium-sized red variety of tomato

== See also ==
- Alicante Innovation and Territory
