= Commins (surname) =

Commins is an Irish surname, derived from Irish Gaelic: Ó Comáin.

Notable people with the surname include:

- Andrew Commins (1829–1916), Irish lawyer and politician
- David Commins (born 1954), American historian
- Eugene D. Commins (1932–2005), American physicist
- John Commins (disambiguation), several people
- Kathleen Commins (1909–2003), Australian journalist
- Kevin Commins (1928–1995), South African cricketer
- Lanna Commins (born 1983), Thai singer
- Murray Commins (born 1997), South African cricketer
- Stuart Commins (born 1988), South African rugby player

== See also ==
- Commins (disambiguation)
- Cummins (surname)
- Commins Menapi (1977–2017), Solomon Islands footballer
- Commins Mewa (born 1965), Solomon Islands politician
