= Comyns =

Comyns can refer to:

== People ==
- Arthur Comyns Carr (1882–1965), English politician
- Barbara Comyns Carr (1907–1992), English author
- Comyns Berkeley (1865–1946), obstetric physician
- Ethel Harriet Comyns-Lewer (1861–1946), British ornithologist and periodical editor, publisher and owner
- John Comyns (1667–1740), English judge
- Joseph Comyns Carr (1849–1916), English art critic and theatre manager
- Louis Comyns (1904–1962), British politician
- Tom Comyns (born 1973), Irish Olympic sprinter
- William Comyns Beaumont (1873–1956), British journalist

== Other ==
- Comyns' Digest, book by John Comyns

== See also ==
- Comins (disambiguation)
- Comyn (disambiguation)
