= Spatial planning in Serbia =

Urban planning activities

Spatial Planning in Serbia (Serbian: Просторно планирање, prostorno planiranje) is the activity which can be recognized under different names in other countries (spatial planning, regional planning, urban planning, land-use planning). The literal translation of the term spatial planning is used in Serbia since the second half of the 20th century, prostor meaning space (adjective. prostorno meaning spatial) and planiranje meaning planning. The term of spatial planning appeared for the first time in the name of one Ministry in 2008 - the Ministry of Environment and Spatial Planning which existed until 2012. From 2012 to 2013 the ministry in charge of spatial planning in Serbia was the Ministry of Natural Resources, Mining and Spatial Planning. From 2014 the Ministry in charge of spatial planning is the Ministry of Construction, Transport and Infrastructure with the Sector for Spatial Planning, Urbanism and Housing.

== Planning processes in Serbia ==
Spatial planning as an institutionalized activity varies from country to country depending on political and economic system, levels of development and social values and institutions, from which take place different objectives, methods of plans elaboration and implementation and planning position. Spatial plans in Serbia take into account the principles of Agenda 21, Habitat III, Aarhus Convention, ESDP and other relevant international documents.

In the Serbian planning system, spatial planning is conducted at three spatial levels, as regulated by national law:

- Local
- Regional
- National

The new Law on Planning and Construction from 2009 defines the following types of spatial plans:

- The Spatial Plan of Republic of Serbia
- The Regional Spatial Plan
- The Spatial Plan of Local Communities
- The Spatial Plan for Special-Purpose Areas

=== National level ===
The elaboration of the first spatial plan of the Republic of Serbia started in 1968 and lasted for 28 years. The plan was adopted in 1996. The structure of the plan consists of the following chapters: basic goals and objectives, use and protection of natural resources, population, settlements and regionalisation, transport, tourism, environment, natural and cultural heritage, land use, maps, implementation of the plan. The plan had a time frame of 15 years, expiring in 2010.

The second spatial plan of the Republic of Serbia was adopted in 2010 for the period until 2020. The structure of the plan consists of the following chapters: vision, principles and objectives, regional development, nature, ecology and protection, population, settlements and social development, economy, transport and infrastructure, spatial integration with surrounding countries, indicators and key priorities. A separate document Program of Implementation of Spatial Plan of the Republic of Serbia was adopted for the first half of the planning period until 2015 and the second one for the period 2016-2020.

The third spatial plan of the Republic of Serbia is currently being elaborated for the period from 2021 until 2035, based on the Decision of the Government of Serbia adopted in 2019. The early public hearing took place in March 2020.

=== Regional level ===
On the regional level, the territory of Serbia was completely (except Kosovo*) covered with the plans at regional level in 2015 what was the long term intention. Nine regional spatial plans are adopted (South Pomoravlje, Timok Valley, Ponisavlje and Toplica, Zlatibor and Moravica, Region of Belgrade, Vojvodina), Braničevo and Podunavlje, Kolubara and Mačva and Šumadija, Pomoravlje, Raška and Rasina. Plans for Areas of Special Purpose are regional or local level plans for specific territories like: national parks or other protected natural or cultural heritage sites, infrastructure corridors, water accumulations, mining areas or other.

=== Local level ===
On the local level, there are local self-government units spatial plans (cities or municipalities) and urban plans. Rules regarding organisation, protection, construction and regulation of space make part of those plans, together with the objectives of spatial development and land use.

== Planning development stages ==
=== Before 1945 ===
The first urban plan for the city of Belgrade was made in 1867 by Emilijan Josimovic for the part of the contemporary central Belgrade. The first legal act passed in the Kingdom of Yugoslavia concerning urban-planning was the Civil-Building code (Građevinski Zakon) in 1931, which at that time regulated planning methods for cities.

=== 1945-1965 ===
During this period the first spatial planning organizations were established, along with the Republic authorities/bodies responsible for urban affairs. After WWII, the Regulation of the Master Plan was developed in 1949. The meeting of professional urban planners which was held in 1957 in Aranđelovac put an accent on the regional development as a necessary part of the integrated spatial development policy. First law on spatial planning was adopted in 1965.

=== 1960-1992 ===
This period was characterized by elaboration of regional and spatial plans, it was an ambitious period when many activities were initiated bet not all of them were finished. It was the period of building capacities and methodology of spatial planning. During that period the Department of spatial planning was created in 1977 at the University of Belgrade offering the undergraduate education for spatial planners. The law on spatial planning was changed two times during this period - in 1974 and in 1988.

=== 1992-2008 ===
This was a period of crisis and wars in Serbia, the spatial planning which was initiated in the previous period continued its activities. The law on spatial planning was changed two times - in 1995 and in 2003. The first Spatial Plan of the Republic of Serbia was adopted in 1996. The Agency for Spatial Planning of the Republic of Serbia was created in 2003.

=== 2008-2015 ===
The new law on spatial planning was adopted in 2009. The intention to cover the territory of Serbia with plans on all levels is on the good way. The second Spatial Plan of the Republic of Serbia was adopted in 2010. In 2015 the elaboration of all plans at regional level is achieved as well as at local level, the last plan completed was for the municipality of Novi Kneževac in Vojvodina. The turn is being made towards better implementation, more efficient administrative procedures and improved use of ICT and GIS in spatial planning.

== Sources ==
1. Stojkov B. 2000: Metode prostornog planiranja, Geografski Fakultet, Beograd 2000.
2. Djordjevic D. 2009: System of Spatial planning in Serbia - A critical overview, Razgledi - Dela 31, p:143-157.
