= Kromme Waal =

Street in Amsterdam

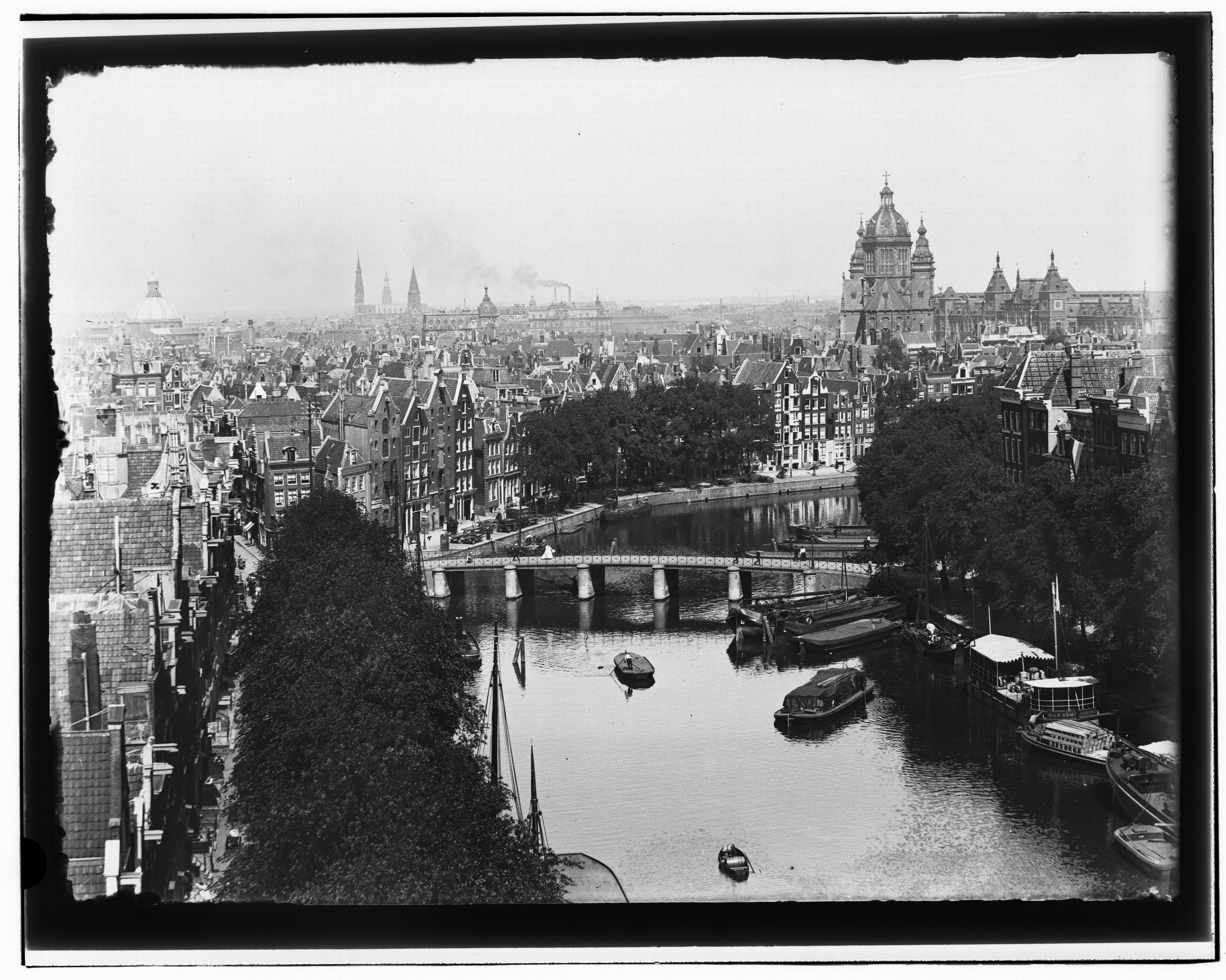

- Location within Amsterdam
- Location: Amsterdam
- Postal code: 1016
- Coordinates: 52.374405°N 4.902537°E
- North end: Prins Hendrikkade
- To: Oude Waal

The Kromme Waal is a street in Amsterdam between the Prins Hendrikkade and the Oude Waal. From Kraansluis (bridge 300, in the Prins Hendrikkade) to Waalseilandbrug (bridge 283), the street forms the western quay of the Waalseilandsgracht, the old inner harbor of Amsterdam between the Montelbaanstoren and the IJ.

== Trivia ==
- The architect Bernard Bijvoet (1889-1979) was born here.
- A photo of a tugboat in the Kromme Waal adorns the cover of The Beach Boys' album Holland (1973).
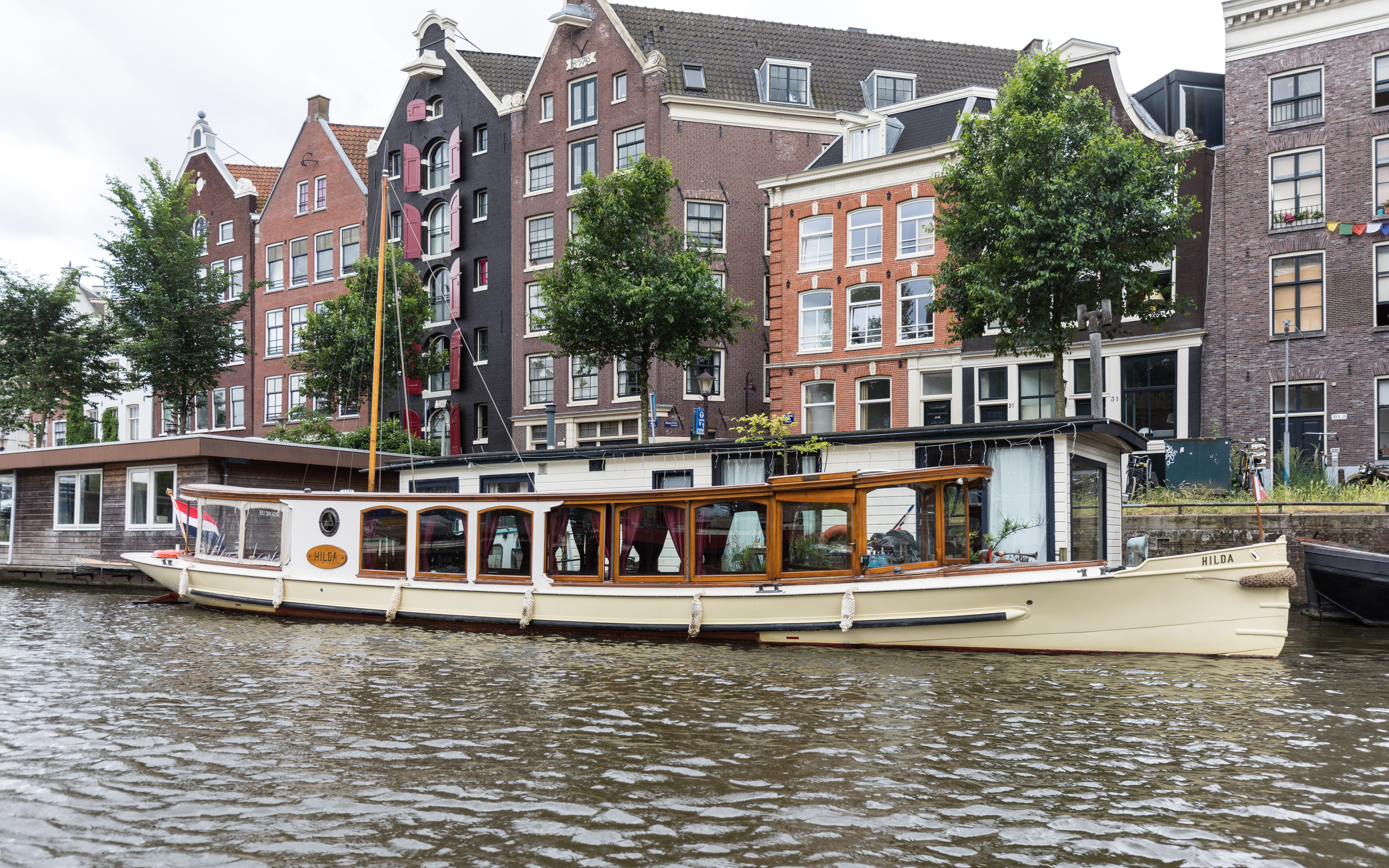
Houseboats on the Waalseilandgracht and houses on the Kromme Waal street (June 2017)

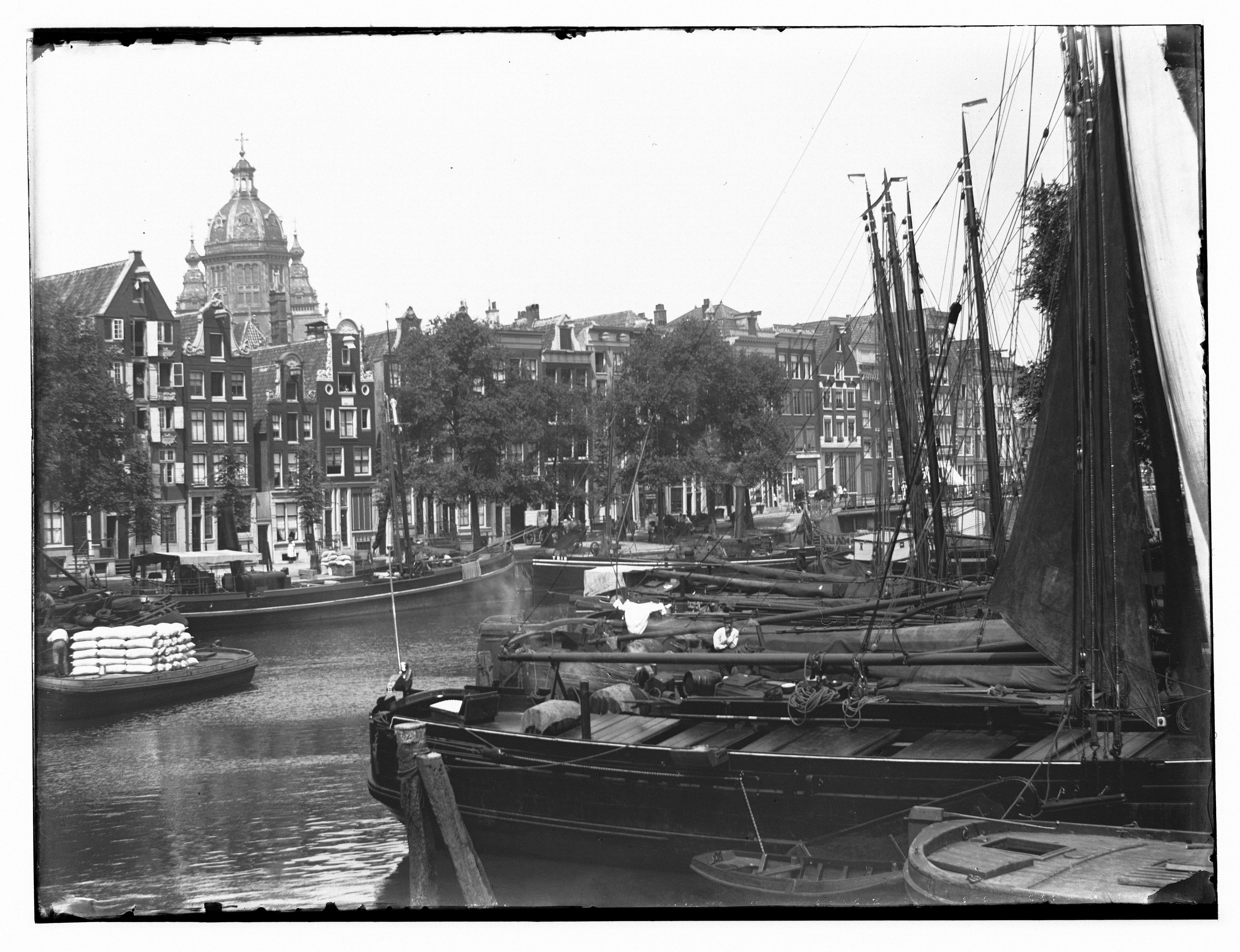
Kromme Waal looking north towards bridge 300, 1897
