= Sonotope =

A sonotope is a physical site (Greek: -topos) that produces sound (Latin: sono-) in a particular way. It is characterized by sound phenomena that occur according to a specific pattern at that location. It can be compared to the concept of a biotope. The soundscape of the place can be distinguished from imaginary soundscapes in, for example, films or radio programs.

In spatial planning, urban design and landscape architecture, the concept has been implemented to enhance the awareness, understanding, and design of landscapes and settlements as being multimodal. The visual hegemony in these fields of study and practice, is balanced by incorporating hearing as an additional sense, leading to an understanding of landscapes not only visually but also aurally - as environments that embrace site specific soundscapes.

The concept has been further developed into sonotope analysis and a sonotope hypothesis.
