= Spatial planning =

Technique for physical organisation of space

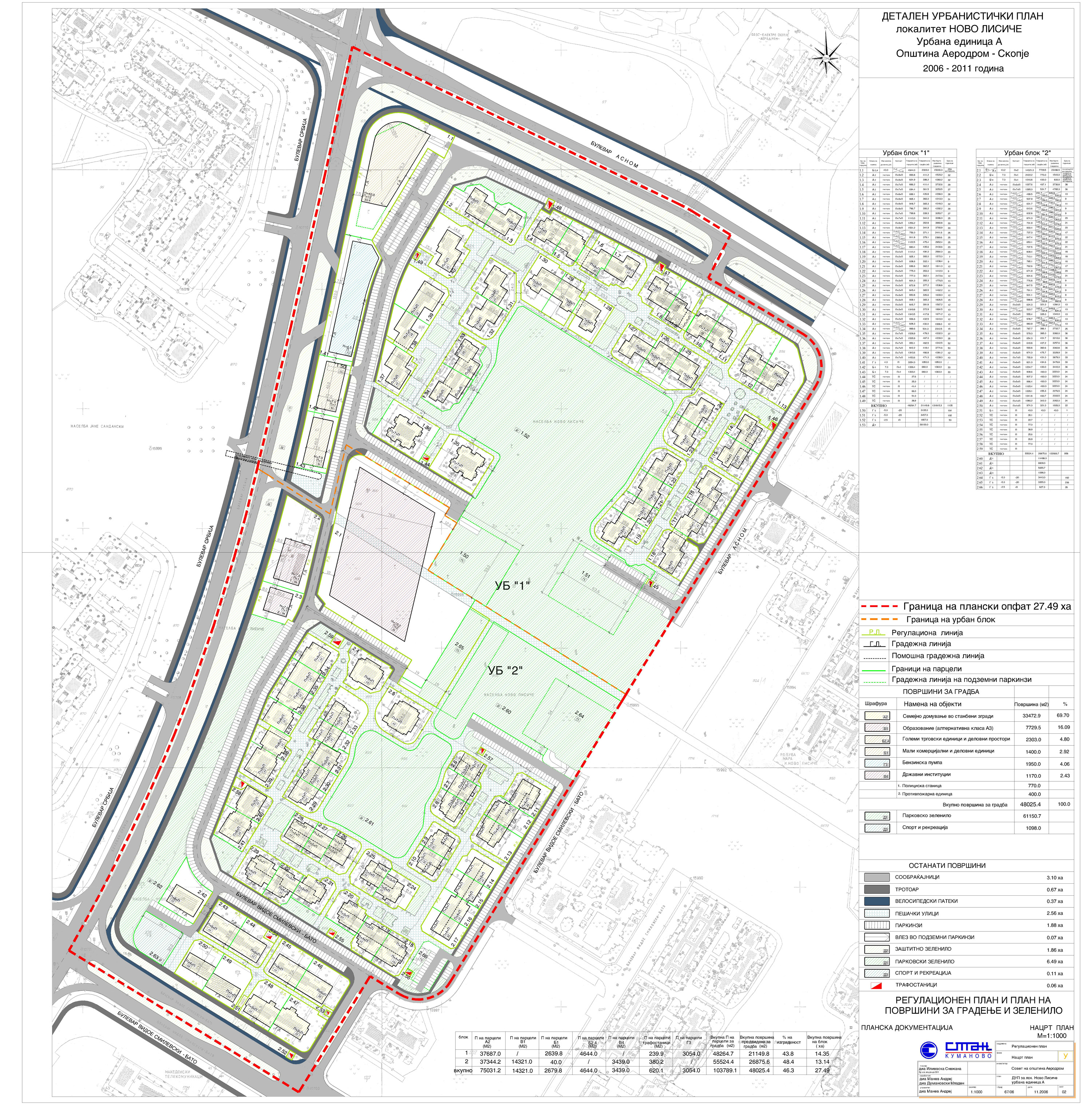
The graphical scheme of the Detailed Urbanist Plan for a settlement within the Municipality of Aerodrom in the City of Skopje, North Macedonia.

Spatial planning is the management of space and resources through the creation and implementation of a plan restricting how space can be used and developed. Spatial planning is normally undertaken by state actors—at either the national, regional or local levels—but is sometimes undertaken by private sector actors as well. In achieving set policy aims, it usually tries to balance the competing demands upon land as a resource, mediating between the demands of the state, market, and local community.

In so doing, three different mechanisms—of involving stakeholders, integrating sectoral policies and promoting development projects—mark the three schools of transformative strategy formulation, innovation action and performance in spatial planning.

Discrete professional disciplines which involve spatial planning include land use, urban, regional, transport and environmental planning. Other related areas are also important, including economic and community planning, as well as maritime spatial planning.

Numerous planning systems exist around the world. The form of planning largely diverges and co-evolves with societies and their governance systems. Every country, and states within those countries, have a unique planning systems that is made up by different actors, different planning perspectives and a particular institutional framework. Perspectives, actors and institutions change over time, influencing both the form and the impact of spatial planning. Especially in Northwestern Europe, spatial planning has evolved greatly since the late 1950s. Until the 1990s, the term ‘spatial’ was used primarily to refer to the way that planning should deal with more than simply zoning, land use planning, or the design of the physical form of cities or regions, but also should address the more complex issues of the spatial relationship of activities such as employment, homes and leisure uses.

== Definition ==
An early definition of spatial planning comes from the European Regional/Spatial Planning Charter (often called the 'Torremolinos Charter'), adopted in 1983 by the European Conference of Ministers responsible for Regional Planning (CEMAT): "Regional/spatial planning gives geographical expression to the economic, social, cultural and ecological policies of society. It is at the same time a scientific discipline, an administrative technique and a policy developed as an interdisciplinary and comprehensive approach directed towards a balanced regional development and the physical organization of space according to an overall strategy."

== Rationale ==
Spatial planning is necessary due to the competing demands on space—from the economy, social needs (e.g. housing), and environmental protection.

Spatial planning is especially important in developing countries which often face rapid urbanisation and industralisation, which places pressure on existing urban infrastructure.

== By country ==
=== China ===
Spatial planning in mainland China is known as territorial spatial planning.

=== European Union ===
Various compendia of spatial planning systems can be found. Below is a table showing some of the main sources, the countries covered and the date of publication.

Key to columns (left to right)
COMMIN	COMmon MINdscapes
COST C11	COST Action on Green Structures and Urban Planning
ESPON	European Observation Network for Territorial Development and Cohesion COMPASS project
DG-REGIO	European Directorate-General for Regional Policy
CEMAT	European Conference of Ministers responsible for Regional/Spatial Planning
ESTIA	European Space and Territorial Integration Alternative
ISOCARP	International Society of City and Regional Planners
MLIT	Japanese Ministry of Land, Infrastructure, Transport and Tourism
LEXALP	Legal Systems for Spatial Planning
RCEP	Royal Commission on Environmental Pollution
UNECE	United Nations Economic Commission for Europe
VASAB	Vision and Strategies around the Baltic Sea

	COMMIN	COST C11	ESPON	DG-REGIO	CEMAT	ESTIA	ISOCARP	MLIT	LEXALP	RCEP	UNECE	VASAB
Albania						2000						
Armenia					2006						2000	
Austria			2007	1997			2008		2008			
Belarus	2007											2000
Belgium			2007	1997			2008					
Bulgaria			2007		2003	2000	2008					
Cyprus			2007									
Czech Republic			2007				2008					
Denmark	2007	2005	2007	1997			2008					2019
Estonia	2007		2007				2008					2018
Finland	2007	2005	2007	1997	2005		2008					2018
France		2005	2007	1997			2008	2007	2008	2000		
Georgia											2003	
Germany	2007	2005	2007	1997			2008	2007	2008	2000		2019
Greece			2007	1997		2000	2008					
Hungary			2007			2000	2008					
Rep. Ireland			2007	1997			2008			2000		
Italy		2005	2007	1997			2008		2008			
Latvia	2007		2007								1998	2018
Lithuania	2007		2007								1998	2018
Luxembourg			2007	1997	2006		2008					
Malta			2007									
Netherlands		2005	2007	1997			2008	2007		2000		
North Macedonia						2000					2002	
Norway	2007	2005	2007				2008					2000
Poland	2007	2005	2007				2008					2018
Portugal			2007	1997	2004		2008					
Romania			2007			2000					2001	
Russian Federation	2007						2008					2020
Serbia						2000	2008				2007	
Slovakia			2007				2008					
Slovenia			2007		2003				2008		1997	
Spain		2005	2007	1997			2008					
Sweden	2007	2005	2007	1997			2008			2000		2018
Switzerland			2007				2008		2008			
Turkey							2008					
United Kingdom		2005	2007	1997			2008	2007		2000		

==== European-wide spatial planning ====
In 1999, a document called the European Spatial Development Perspective (ESDP) was signed by the ministers responsible for regional planning in the EU member states. Although the ESDP has no binding status, and the European Union has no formal authority for spatial planning, the ESDP has influenced spatial planning policy in European regions and member states, and placed the coordination of EU sectoral policies on the political agenda.

At the European level, the term territorial cohesion is becoming more widely used and is for example mentioned in the draft EU Treaty (Constitution) as a shared competency of the European Union; it is also included in the Treaty of Lisbon. The term was defined in a "scoping document" in Rotterdam in late 2004 and is being elaborated further using empirical data from the ESPON programme in a document entitled "The Territorial State and Perspectives of the European Union". At the minister's conference in May 2007 in Leipzig, a political document called the "Territorial Agenda" was signed to continue the process begun in Rotterdam, revised in May 2011 in Gödöllő.

=== United Kingdom ===
Spatial planning in the UK is known as town and country planning.

== See also ==
- Architecture
- Comprehensive planning
- European Spatial Development Perspective
- Geography
- ISOCARP - International Society of City and Regional Planners
- Landscape architecture
- Land use planning
- Location theory
- Permeability (spatial and transport planning)
- Principles of Intelligent Urbanism
- Regional planning
- Spatial Citizenship
- Territorial spatial planning
- Unified settlement planning
- Urban planning
- Urban sprawl
