= Comins =

Comins may refer to:

As an Irish surname, it is anglicised from Irish Gaelic surname Ó Comáin.

== People ==
- Harry M. Comins (1882–1962), American politician, Mayor of Flint, Michigan (1938–1940)
- Linus B. Comins (1817-1892), American politician from Massachusetts
- Richard Blundell Comins (1848–1919), English Anglican priest
- William Comins (1901–1965), American Olympic long jumper

== Places ==
- Comins Township, Michigan
- Comins, Michigan, an unincorporated community
- Comins Coch, Ceredigion, Wales

== See also ==
- Commins (disambiguation)
- Comyns (disambiguation)
