= Comyn =

Comyn can refer to:

== People ==
- Clan Cumming also known as Clan Comyn
- Comyn (surname)

== Places ==
- Comyn Ching Triangle, triangular city block in Covent Garden, London
- Comyn, Texas, community located in Comanche County, Texas
- Newbold Comyn, a park in Leamington Spa, Warwickshire

== Fiction ==
- The Comyn, characters in Darkover who exhibit special mental powers

== See also ==
- Comyns (disambiguation)
- Cumming (disambiguation)
