= European Observation Network for Territorial Development and Cohesion =

The European Observation Network for Territorial Development and Cohesion, often shortened as ESPON, is a European funded programme under the objective of "European Territorial Cooperation" of the Cohesion Policy of the European Union. It is co-funded by the European Regional Development Fund - Interreg.

The mission of the programme is to support policy development in relation to the aim of territorial cohesion and a harmonious development of the European territory. Firstly it provides comparable information, evidence, analyses and scenarios on territorial dynamics and secondly it reveals territorial capital and potentials for the development of regions and larger territories thus contributing to European competitiveness, territorial cooperation and a sustainable and balanced development.

The current ESPON 2020 Programme is carried through by 28 European Union Member States as well as Iceland, Liechtenstein, Norway and Switzerland and the European Commission.

== See also ==
- European Spatial Development Perspective (ESDP)
- Report ESDP
- Territorial Agenda of the EU
- Green Book on Territorial Cohesion
- EU 2020 Strategy
