= Waalseilandsgracht =

Canal in Amsterdam

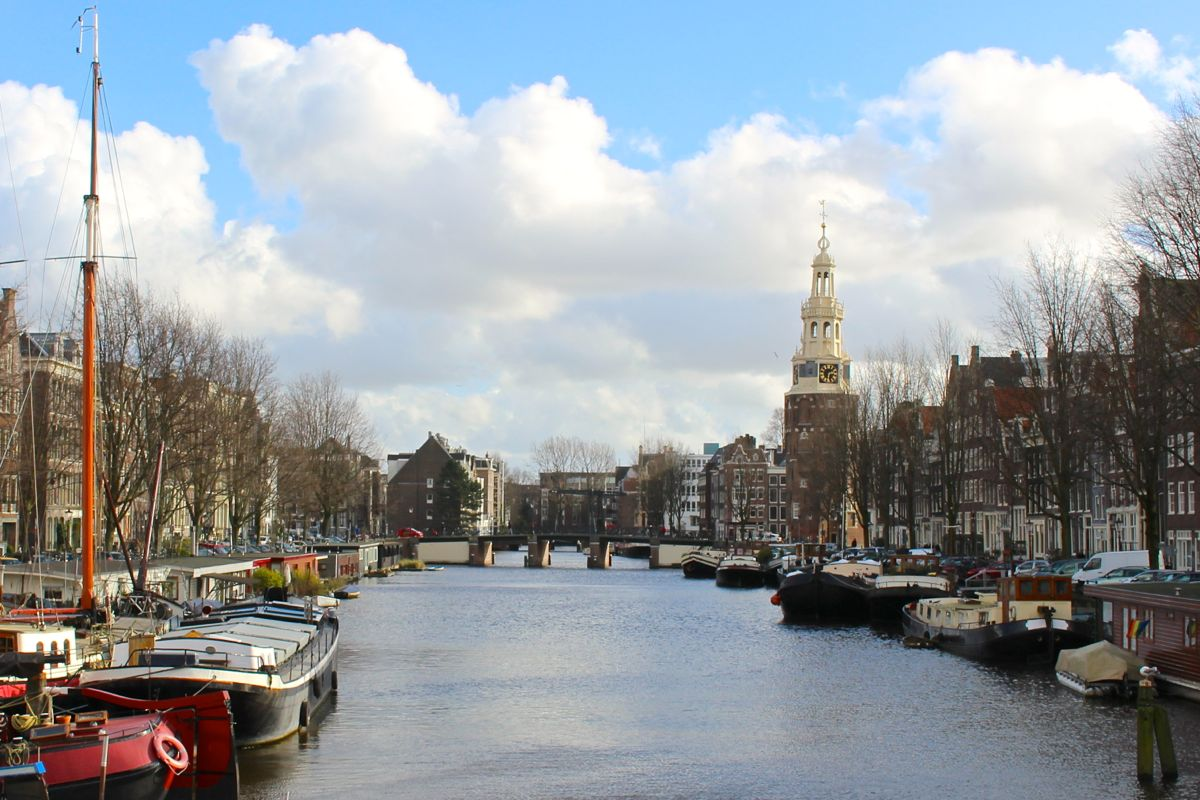
- Waalseilandsgracht and Montelbaanstoren from bridge no. 283.

- Location within Amsterdam
- Location: Amsterdam
- Postal code: 1016
- Coordinates: 52.373569°N 4.903624°E
- South end: Oude Schans, at Montelbaanstoren
- To: Kraansluis (Prins Hendrikkade)

The Waalseilandsgracht, or Waalseilandgracht, is a short, wide canal in the east part of the inner city of Amsterdam.

== Location ==
The Waalseilandsgracht runs between the Oosterdok (originally part of the IJ) at the Scheepvaarthuis and the Oudeschans at the Montelbaanstoren. Three bridges cross the Waalseilandsgracht:

- Prins Hendrikkade crosses at the Oosterdok de Kraansluis (bridge no. 300),
- The monumental Waalseiland bridge (bridge no. 283) crosses the middle
- At the Montelbaan tower along the Oudeschans it is crossed by the Montelbaans bridge (bridge no. 280).

The streets along the water on the west and south side (Lastagebuurt) are called Kromme Waal and Oude Waal. On the northeast side (on the Waalseiland): Binnenkant.

== History ==
The canal is named after the Waalseiland to the northeast of it, which was created by infill in 1644. The Waalseilandsgracht was part of the Port of Amsterdam until the 19th century .

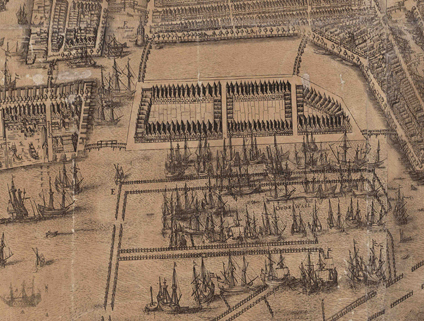
The Waalseilandsgracht (above) around the Waalseiland. On the left the Oudeschans. Detail of a map from 1657.

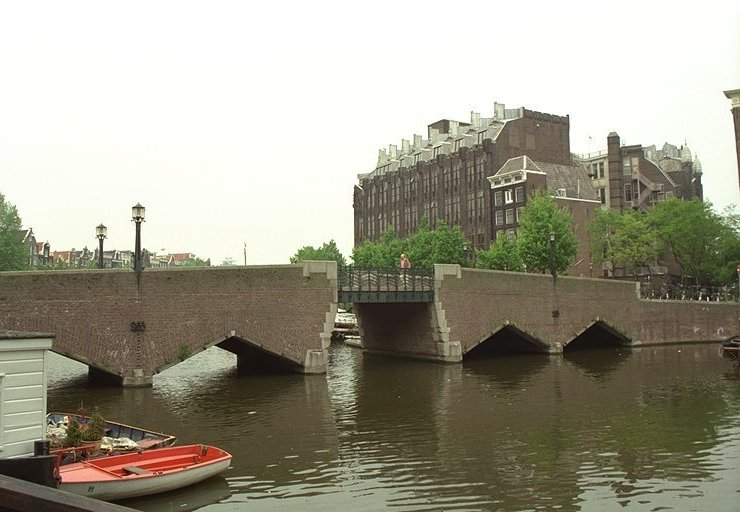
The Waalseiland bridge (bridge no. 283), designed by Joan van der Mey, in the Amsterdam School style, with the Scheepvaarthuis in the background.

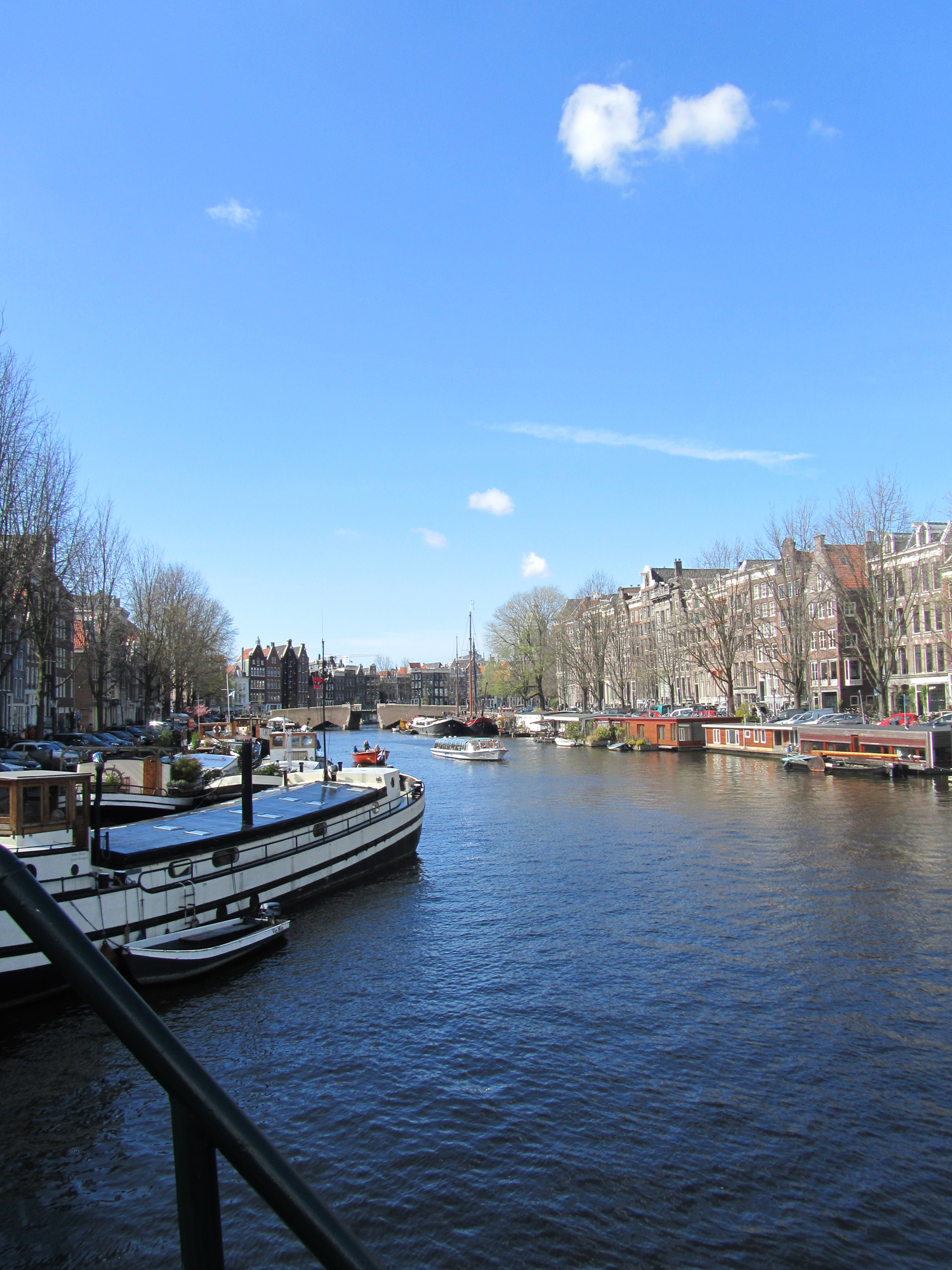
The Waalseilandsgracht with houseboats and the Waalseiland bridge.

== See also ==
- Canals of Amsterdam
