= Suma Gestión Tributaria =

- Established: 1990
- Type: Public Body
- Purpose: Gestión de tributos
- Headquarters: Alicante, Spain
- Key people: Antonio Pérez Pérez; José Antonio Belso Martínez
- Website: http://www.suma.es

Suma Gestión Tributaria (Suma) is a public provincial agency set up by the Provincial Council of Alicante, Spain in 1990. It specializes in tax administration: assessment, billing, collection and enforcement. Suma collects taxes on behalf of each city council.

It's governing body is the Board of Suma, made up of the Executive Director and 7 to 11 Provincial Representatives, chaired by the President of the Provincial Council. There is, in addition, a consultative body, called the Council of Mayors, which guarantees the participation of the delegating Town Councils in the strategies adopted by Suma.

Suma (meaning addition), seeks to express a concept of integration, accumulation, growth, and incorporation. In line with this name, it has developed a culture based on the principle of quality services for the rate-payer and lower costs for municipalities.

== Location ==
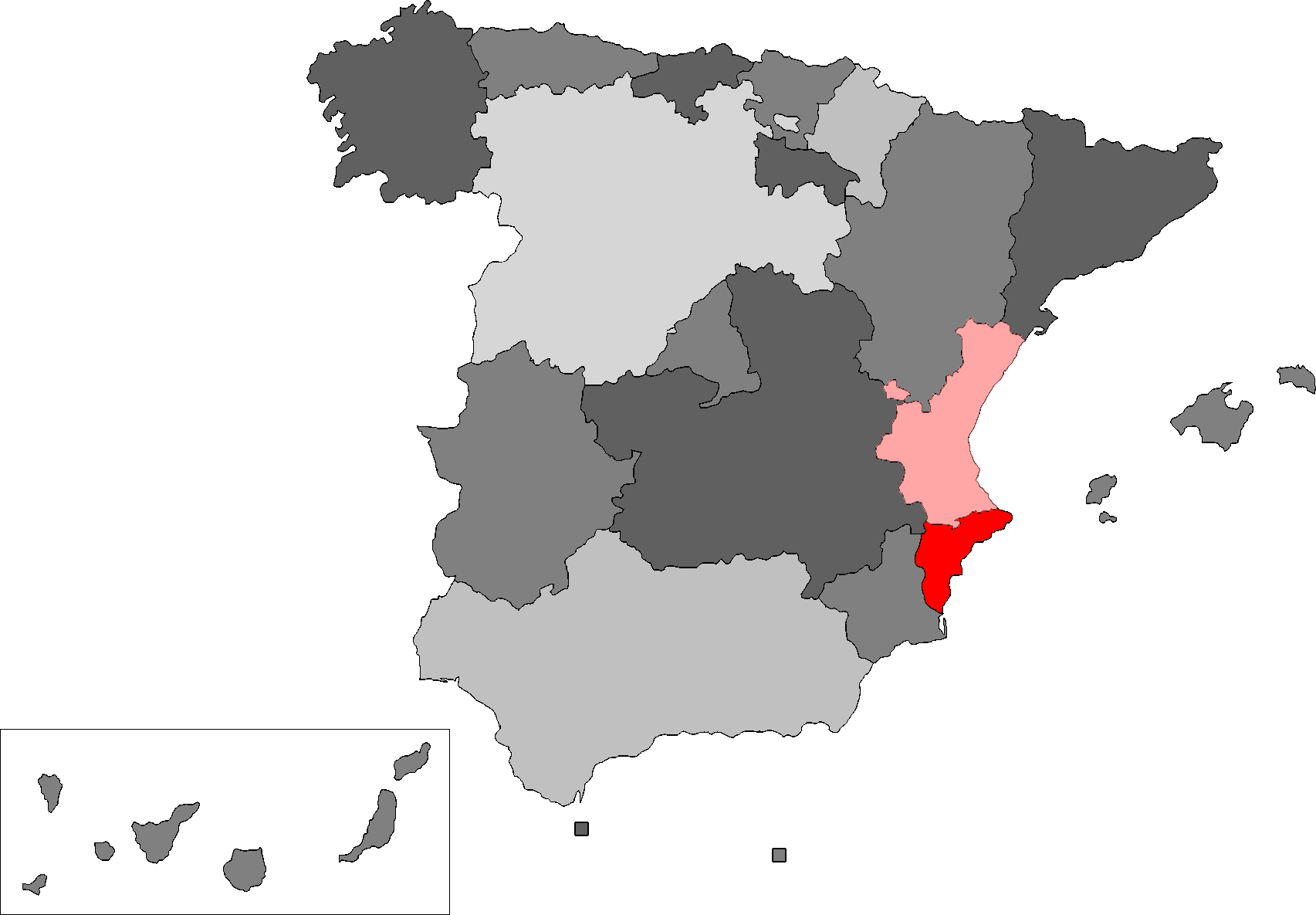
Location of Alicante province in Spain, main action area of Suma.

Suma operates in Spain, specifically in Alicante, one of 3 provinces that make up the Valencian Community, together with Valencia and Castellon.

== Activities ==
Suma is the local agency responsible for the application of local taxes in all town councils of the Alicante Province. Suma is in fact an advance shared-services scheme based on the economies of scale principle.

Suma performs an integrated tax management service. It is responsible for the processing of local taxes from the first instance of a taxable activity or property to the receipt of tax payment by the municipal authorities. This involves a number of activities: updating payment lists, issuing customer bills, and collecting taxes. It is responsible for enforcement, from notification to selling assets in auction following legal proceedings of the Taxation Act. Suma can resolve claims and appeals that arise in the collection process, inspect and monitor the declaration and payment of taxes. The collected revenue is deposited in the municipal accounts monthly.

It has delegated powers for the following taxes and fees:

- Property Tax (IBI).
- Economic Activities Tax (IAE).
- Motor Vehicle Tax (IVTM).
- Capital Gains on Land (IIVTNU).
- Tax on Constructions Installations and Works (ICIO).
- Road Traffic Fines.
- As well as other local fees specific to each municipal authority (Waste Disposal Fee, Sewage, Garage Entrances, etc.)

== Collaboration ==
Suma´s experience led it to collaborate with Spanish local authorities and international organizations.

- Suma has taken part, as consultants, in drawing up the Strategic Plan for tax services of the Municipal Area of Managua.
- Since 2001, Suma has worked with the National Association of Portuguese Municipalities, performing analytic and consultancy tasks.
- It takes an active part in working groups of the Spanish Federation of Municipalities and Provinces.
- It signed a Collaboration Agreement with the Madrid City Council in areas of consultancy and analysis.

Since 2006 Suma closely works with the Island Council of Gran Canaria in the implementation of a local tax administration system based on Suma model. It began working on similar projects with the City Council of Majadahonda (Community of Madrid), in 2005, with the Provincial Council of Albacete in 2012 and with the City Council of Roquetas de Mar (Province of Almería) in 2023.

Suma has taken part in forums, conferences and international events and collaborates with institutions as IRRV (Institute of Revenues, Rating and Valuation, GB), Lincoln Institute of Land Policy, USA; IPTI (International Property Tax Institute, CAN) and IAAO (International Association of Assessing Officers, USA). Also it has developed in partnership a number of European projects in the field of vocational training under the auspices of the Leonardo da Vinci programme.

== Projects ==
- On the basis of power delegation agreements, Suma manages local taxes in all municipal areas of the province of Alicante (141 town councils)
- It deals with approximately 2 million rate-payers.
- It has a network of 46 fixed branches throughout the province.

== Governance ==
Presidents
Period	Name	Political party
1993–1995	Ilmo. Sr. D. Antonio Mira-Perceval Pastor	PSOE
1995–2003	Ilmo. Sr. D. Julio de España Moya	PP
2003–2011	Ilmo. Sr. D. José Joaquín Ripoll Serrano	PP
2011-2015	Ilma. Sra. Dª. Luisa Pastor Lillo	PP
2015-2019	Ilmo. Sr. D. César Sánchez Pérez	PP
2019-...	Ilmo. Sr. D. Carlos Mazón Guixot	PP

Directors
Period	Name
1993–1998	D. Fernando Plaza González
1998–2007	D. José Francisco Trigueros Sellés
2007–2011	D. José López Garrido
2011-2015	D. Manuel De Juan Navarro
2016-March 2016	Dª Encarnación Sánchez Sala
March 2016 – 2019	D. José Manuel Bonilla Gavilanes
2019-March 2021	Dª Encarnación Sánchez Sala
April 2021-...	D. José Antonio Belso Martínez

Note: since 1990 to 1993, the name of this public body was Organismo Autónomo Provincial de Gestión Tributaria de Alicante. In 1993, the name was changed to Suma.
