= Commin =

EU funded spatial development project in the Baltic Sea Region

COMMIN, from COMmon MINdscapes, is an EU-financed project concerned with spatial development in the Baltic Sea Region. Its goal is to interconnect the countries on the Baltic Sea — Germany, Poland, Denmark, Sweden, Finland, Lithuania, Latvia, Estonia, and Russia — as well as Norway and Belarus, in their goal to achieve an international basis in spatial development.

The project has 28 partners from 11 countries, including universities, government departments, and private companies, and is coordinated by the Academy for Spatial Research and Planning (ARL) in Hanover, Germany. The project runs from September 2004 until August 2007.

In order to reach this goal, the project members have created an on-line glossary of the most important scientific terms concerning spatial development. This glossary can be translated into 11 languages.
