= Kevin Commins =

South African cricketer (1928–1995)

Personal information
- Born: 23 February 1928; Cape Town, South Africa
- Died: 3 October 1995 (aged 67); Cape Town, South Africa
- Source: Cricinfo, 6 December 2020

Kevin Commins (23 February 1928 – 3 October 1995) was a South African cricketer. He played in twenty-nine first-class matches from 1951/52 to 1960/61.
