= Huis de Pinto =

Coordinates: 52°22′12″N 4°54′03″E

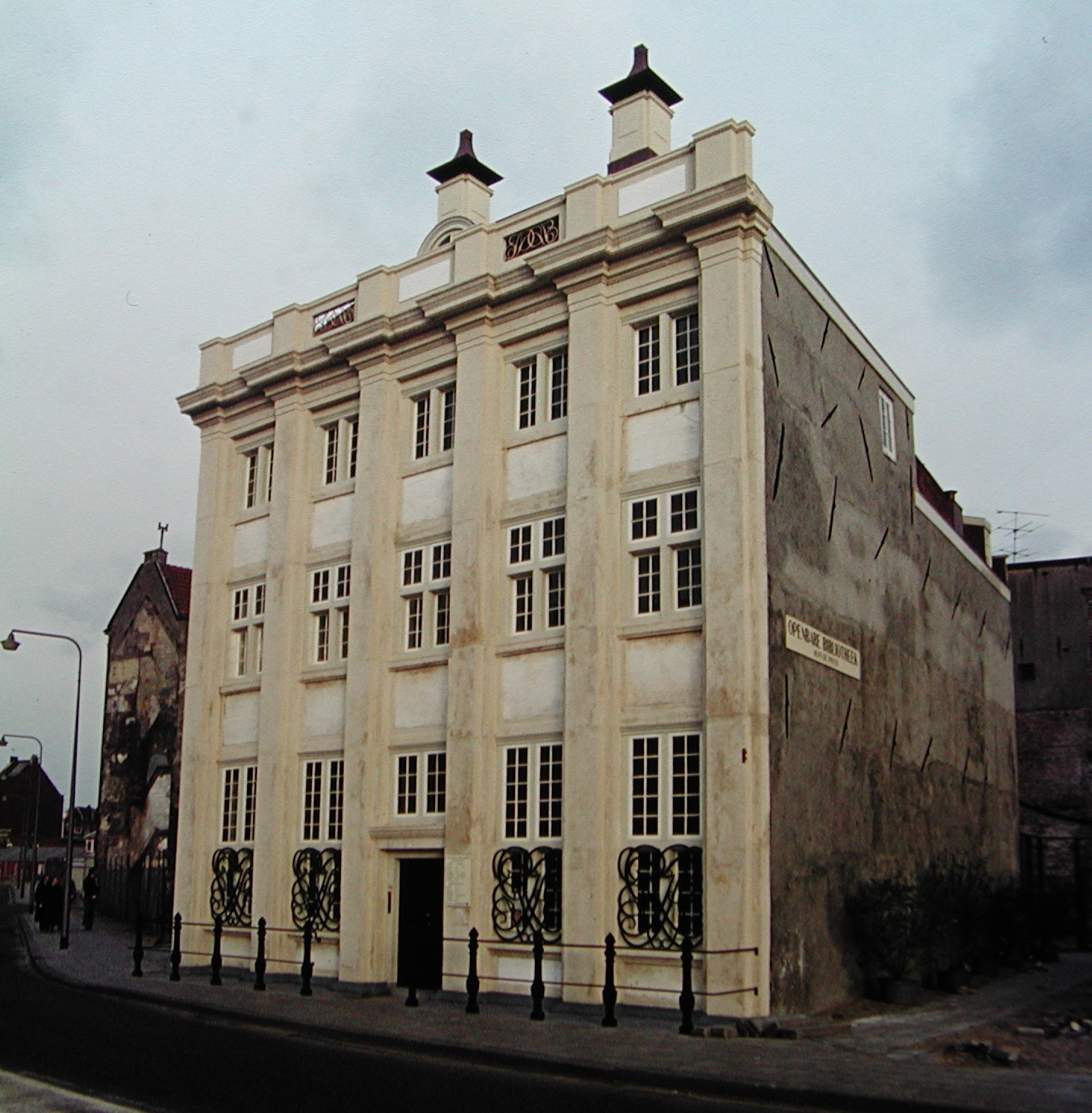
Huis de Pinto before buildings went up on either side of it

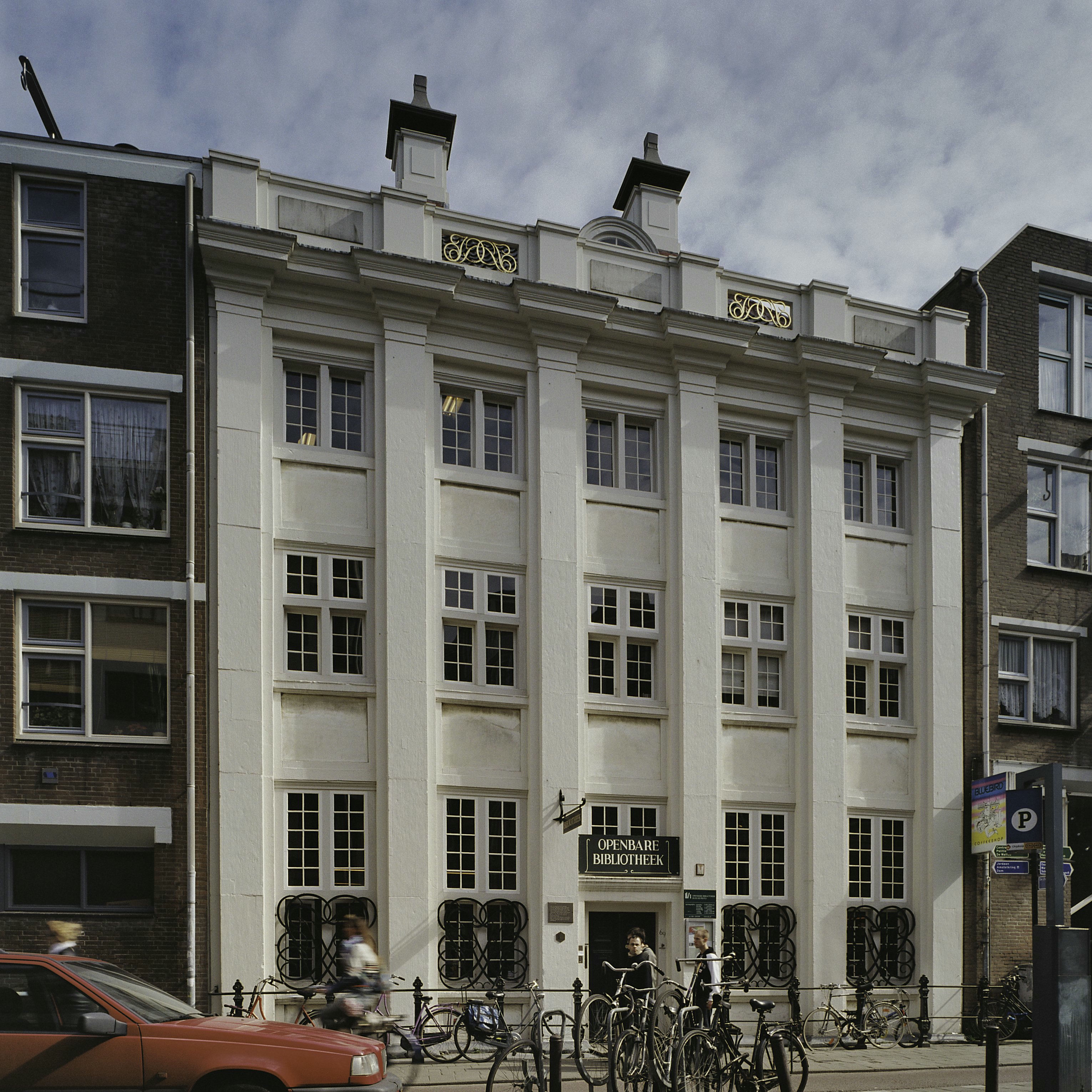
Huis de Pinto as a public library

Huis De Pinto is a former Amsterdam city mansion on the Sint Antoniesbreestraat near the Rembrandthuis. It was originally built in 1605 and is named after a leading Amsterdam family dynasty of Portuguese-Jewish merchant bankers. The founder of this dynasty was Isaack de Pinto, from Antwerp, who bought the house in 1651. His son commissioned the unusual facade, and his grandson Isaac de Pinto grew up there.

Jacob Vromen, born on 1930, research and development in chemistry, and owing a skincare business, living in Australia, Sydney, is the grandson of Rosalie Vromen, born Pinto on 30 July 1880(?), who was the direct ancestor of the Pinto dynasty.

== Construction ==
It was built in 1605 as a double house. The unusual facade uniting the two houses was added after 1680.

== Residents and Functions ==
- In 1605, Jan Jansz. Carel (1545-1616), a VOC director owned both houses and rented them out.
- In 1622 Albert Burgh's brother, the brewer Abel Mathijsz. Burch bought them (and rented them out).
- In 1651 they were sold by the Burch heirs to Isaack de Pinto (who died 1681)
- Inherited by his only son David de Pinto, who bought the neighboring house in 1686 and ordered the double facade designed by Elias Bouman.
- Sold in 1756 by Aron de David de Pinto
- Almost demolished during WWII
- Restored in 1975
- Public library 1975-2012
- Offices and community hall
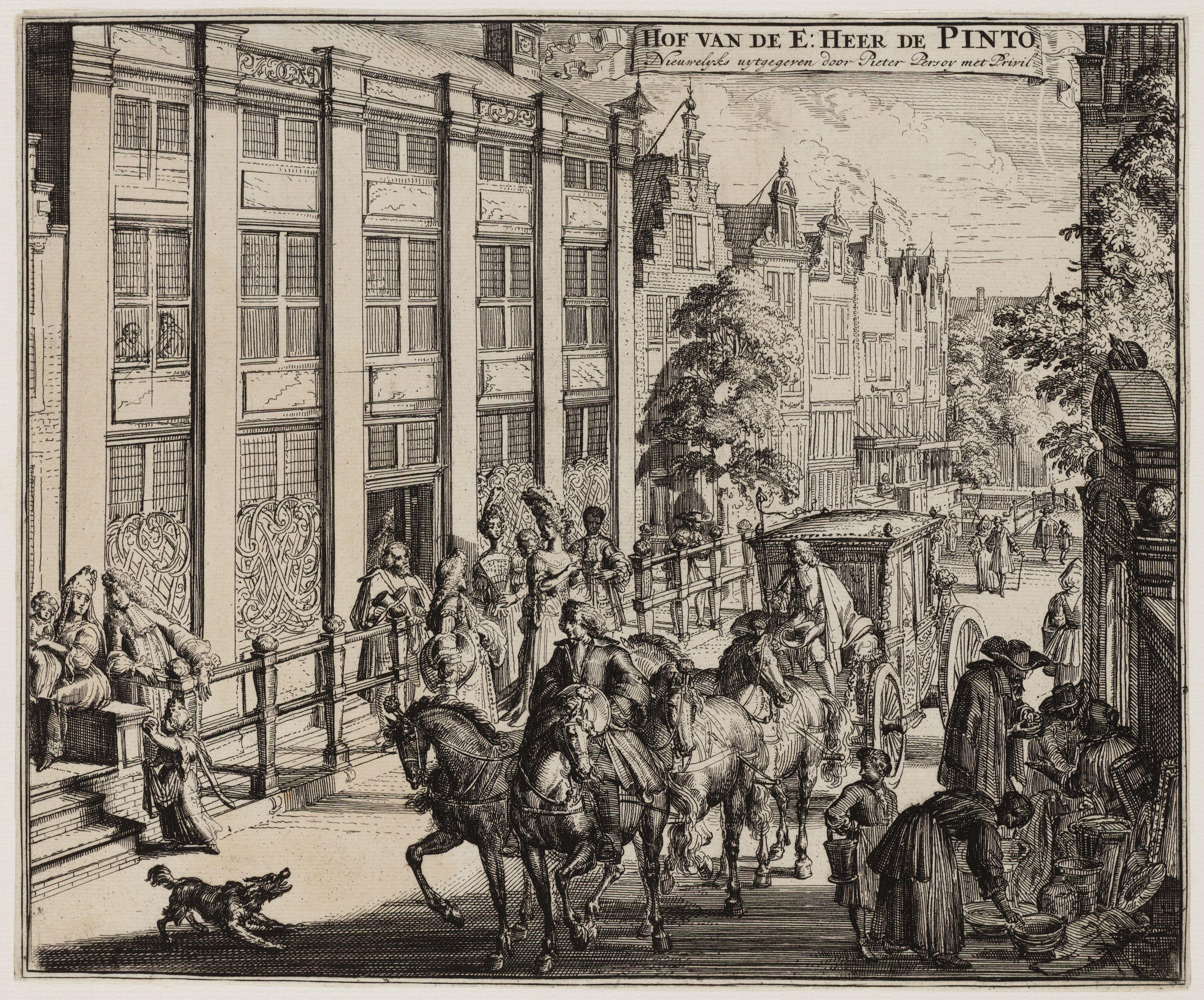
Engraving of the house in 1680 by Romeyn de Hooghe
