= Ethel Harriet Comyns-Lewer =

Periodical proprietor and editor

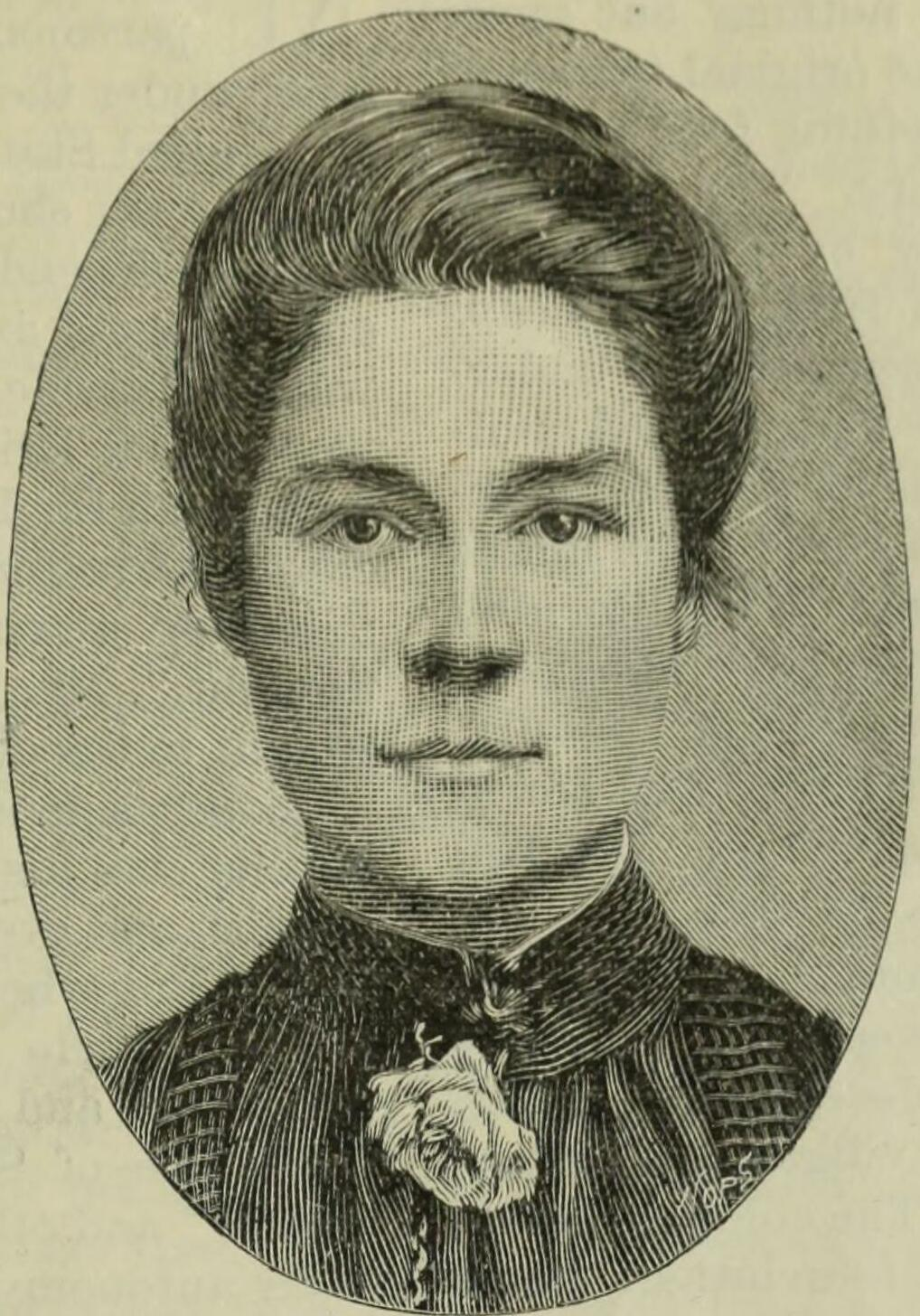
- "Mrs. Comyns." as depicted in an 1892 edition of The Review of Reviews
- Born: 28 January 1861
- Died: 8 February 1946 (aged 85)

Ethel Harriet Comyns-Lewer (née Garrett, 28 January 1861 – 8 February 1946) was a British ornithologist, periodical publisher and editor. Her work Feathered World would lead her to be the first women editor, owner and/or publisher outside of the traditional 'Woman's' magazine sphere.

== Life ==
Ethel Harriet Garrett was born on the 28 January 1861, in Dum Dum, India. The eldest child of Newson Dunnell Garrett, an Anglo-Indian officer in the Royal Artillery, and Elizabeth Kate Louisa Jane. She was niece of both the suffragist Millicent Fawcett and the first woman to qualify in Britain as a physician and surgeon, Elizabeth Garrett Anderson, as well a cousin Philippa Fawcett, the first woman Senior Wrangler.

In 1884, she was involved in the founding of the Ladies' Typewriting Office of Chancery Lane. This society, with links to the Society for the Employment of Women and Women's Printing Society, trained young women for careers in the new commercial world, as well as operating as a typewriting office for individual business.

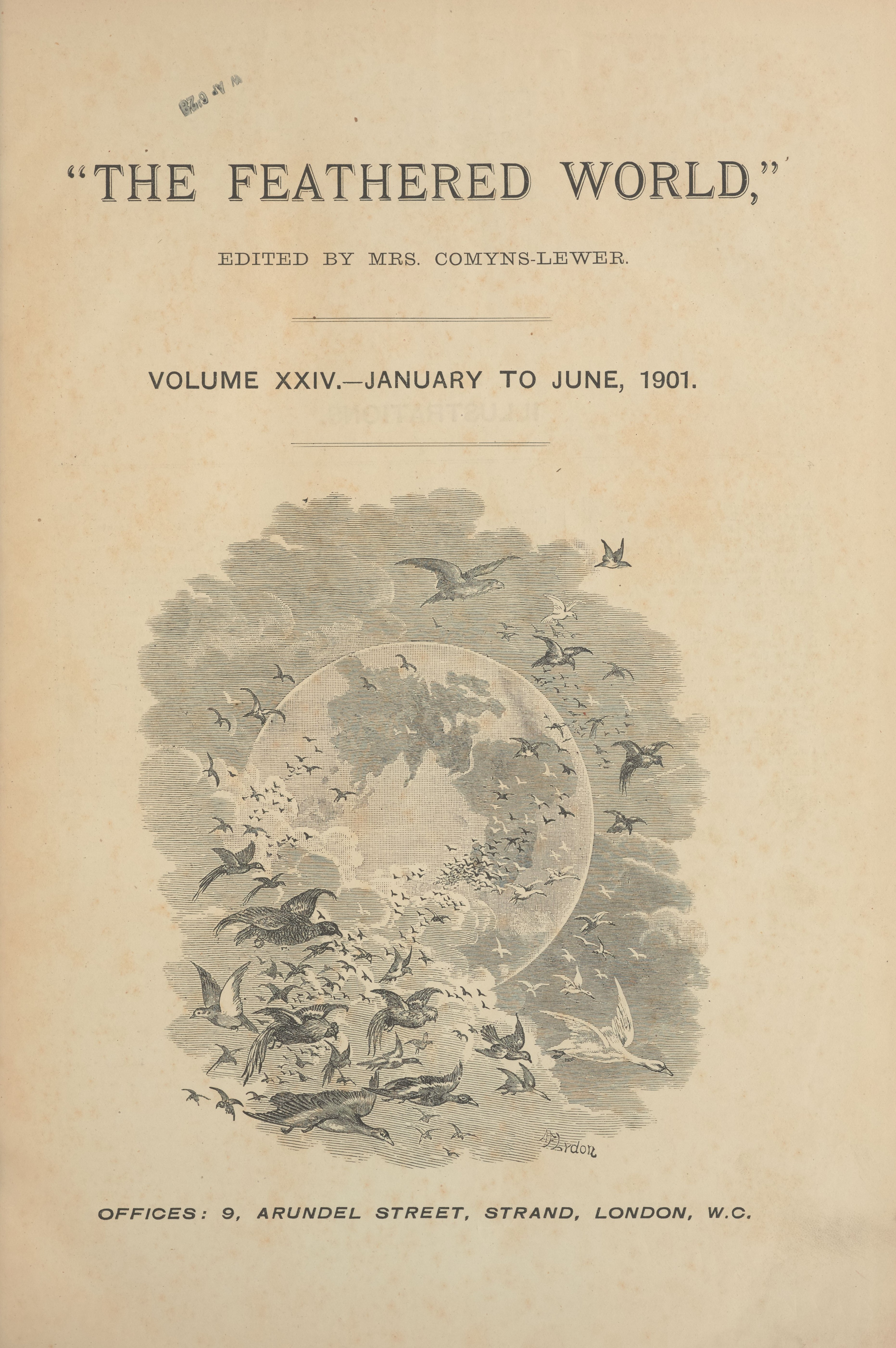
Title page of 24th Volume of The Feathered World, which covers issues from January to June 1901

She married Alexander Comyns in 1887, taking the name Ethel Harriet Comyns, and together they had three children. Alexander would go on to found the ornithological publication the Feathered World but would die only eighteen months later. After his death she took over as editor of the paper raising its circulation to 12,000 - 20,000 weekly by 1892. She would go on to found more publications, which were chiefly popular publications on birds. At the time of her takeover she was the only woman editor, owner and publisher outside of the traditional 'Woman's' magazine space.

She would remarry in 1896 to publisher and editor S. H. Lewer, taking the surname Comyns-Lewer, as did her three children. During the first world war her son, Alexander David, would be killed during Battle of Messines in November 1914. Her two daughters Ethel Rachel and Olive Alexander, would eventually work as editors with her on Feathered World, along with BBC broadcaster A. P. Thompson.

She retired from Feathered World in 1935 and travelled extensively with her husband during their retirement. She died on 8 February 1946.

== Works ==
On top of her work on Feathered World, Comyns-Lewer co-wrote several books with her husband on the topic of poultry. She also, with the geneticist Reginald C. Punnett, undertook genetic studies of poultry and collaborated with him on a bibliography that was published by Feathered World as part of Punnett's Notes on Old Poultry Books.
