= Commins, Denbighshire =

Village in Denbighshire, Wales

Coordinates: 53.156°N 3.316°W

Commins
- Location within Denbighshire
- OS grid reference: SJ120629
- Community: Llangynhafal
- Principal area: Denbighshire
- Preserved county: Clwyd
- Country: Wales
- Sovereign state: United Kingdom
- Post town: RUTHIN
- Postcode district: LL15
- Dialling code: 01824
- Police: North Wales
- Fire: North Wales
- Ambulance: Welsh
- UK Parliament: Clwyd East
- Senedd Cymru – Welsh Parliament: Clwyd West

Commins is a small settlement of about half a dozen dwellings in Denbighshire, Wales. It is 4 kilometres (2 mi) north of the town of Ruthin.

It was in the parish of Llangynhafal.
