= ISOCARP =

International non-governmental organization

The International Society of City and Regional Planners (ISOCARP) is a non-governmental global association of professional city and regional planners.

ISOCARP was founded in 1965, and its first president was the co-founder Prof. Sam van Embden (1965–1975). By 2024, ISOCARP connects individual and institutional members from more than 90 countries. Pietro Elisei is the current president of the board, working alongside 11 other members of the executive committee from around the world, with a head office located in The Hague, Netherlands. ISOCARP is formally accredited as an NGO by the United Nations and the Council of Europe and has formal consultative status as a recognized NGO with UNESCO.

== About ==
ISOCARP aims to help improve cities and planning practices by supporting a global and active network of practitioners in their exchange of experiences, training, education, and research. ISOCARP also seeks to promote the profession of planning and to enhance public awareness and understanding of planning issues at a global level. ISOCARP organizes several activities, as the annual World Planning Congress, a series of publications, awards for best practices, training programs, and workshops for professional support in planning.

In 2016, ISOCARP announced a "research spin-off" of the main association titled "Centre for Urban Excellence". While aiming to serve as an "Urban Think Tank," the primary objectives for this institute are to strengthening cross-border collaboration globally, upholding professional excellence in planning, advancing sustainable planning, and increasing awareness of major development trends and promoting best practices.

== World Congress ==
Since 1965, ISOCARP's most prominent event is the annual World Planning Congress. The congresses take place worldwide, with a different theme each year related to topics of global significance.

Nr.	Year	Location	Theme
1st	1965	(Netherlands) Amsterdam	The Position of the Netherlands in a Uniting Europe
37th	2001	(Netherlands) Utrecht	Planning in the Information Age
38th	2002	(Greece) Athens	The Pulsar Effect: Urban Planning and the pulsar effect: Coping with peaks, troughs and repeats in the demand cycle
39th	2003	(Egypt) Cairo	Planning in a More Globalised and Competitive World
40th	2004	(Switzerland) Geneva	Management of Urban Regions - Experiences and New Interventions Possibilities
41st	2005	(Spain) Bilbao	Making Spaces for the Creative Economy
42nd	2006	(Turkey) Istanbul	Cities between Integration and Disintegration – Opportunities and Challenges
43rd	2007	(Belgium) Antwerp	Urban Trialogues. Co-productive ways to relate visioning and strategic urban projects
44th	2008	(China) Dalian	Urban Growth without Sprawl – A way Towards Sustainable Urbanization
45th	2009	(Portugal) Porto	Low Carbon Cities
46th	2010	(Kenya) Nairobi	Sustainable City / Developing World
47th	2011	(China) Wuhan	Liveable Cities: Urbanising World - Meeting the challenge
48th	2012	(Russia) Perm	Fast Forward: Planning in a (hyper) dynamic urban context
49th	2013	(Australia) Brisbane	Frontiers of Planning – Evolving and declining models of city planning practice
50th	2014	(Poland) Gdynia	Urban Transformations – Cities and Water
51st	2015	(Netherlands) Rotterdam	Cities Save the World: Let's Reinvent Planning
52nd	2016	(South Africa) Durban	Cities we Have vs Cities we Need
53rd	2017	(United States) Portland	Smart Communities
54th	2018	(Norway) Bodø	Cool Planning: Changing Climate and Our Urban Future
55th	2019	(Indonesia) Jakarta, Bogor	Beyond the Metropolis
56th	2020	(Qatar) Doha (online)	Post-Oil City: Planning for Urban Green Deals
57th	2021	(Qatar) Doha (hybrid)	Planning Unlocked: New times, Better places, Stronger Communities
58th	2022	Brussels	From Wealthy to Healthy Cities
59th	2023	Toronto	For Climate Action, Urban Finance

== Key activities ==
In addition to the annual congress, ISOCARP conducts workshops for Young Planning Professionals (YPP) and Urban Planning Advisory Teams (UPATs), organized for cities and regions all over the world. YPP workshops are held on a national level to address conflicts with a group of select professionals under age 35. UPATs assist sponsoring organizations by offering the expertise of ISOCARP members to work on complex planning projects and policy initiatives. Previous workshops took place in Russia, China, Australia, Mexico, Kenya, Gaza and the West Bank.

== Publications ==
ISOCARP is the publisher of themed research journals to support the creation and dissemination of knowledge for better planned cities and territories. The ISOCARP Review, published since 2004, is the society's annual flagship publication. Its other central publication is the International Manual of Planning Practice, published in 2015. Other publications and project reports cover the several activities and initiatives of the society.
