= European Spatial Development Perspective =

The European Spatial Development Perspective (ESDP) is a document approved by the Informal Council of Ministers of Spatial Planning of European Commission in Potsdam in 1999. It is a legally non-binding document forming a policy framework with 60 policy options for all tiers of administration with a planning responsibility. The strategic aim is to achieve a balanced and sustainable spatial development strategy.

== Key concepts ==
With the aim to provide an integrated, multi-sectoral and indicative strategy for the spatial development, the key ideas of ESDP are:

- an integrated approach - Not just to look at specific sectors of development activity (e.g. environment, economic development, or transport), but to recognise that they all affect each other;
- spatial development - a much wider view of the development, vital for integrative approach;
- strategic aspects - interlinked actions to achieve balanced and sustainable territorial development;
- indicative views - the responsibility lies with the developed regions and territories to implement the development principals.
- Inclusive growth - regional approach to address disparities.

== Spatial policy guidelines ==
1. Development of a polycentric and balanced urban system, and strengthening of the partnership between urban and rural areas, so as to create a new urban-rural relationship.
2. Promotion of integrated transport and communication concepts, which support the polycentric development of the EU territory, so that there is gradual progress towards parity of access to infrastructure and knowledge.
3. Wise management of the natural and cultural heritage, which will help conserve regional identities and cultural diversity in the face of globalisation.

== See also ==
- ESPRID
- Interreg
