= Montelbaanstoren =

Coordinates: 52°22′19.41″N 4°54′20.46″E

The Montelbaanstoren is a tower on the bank of the Oudeschans – a canal in Amsterdam. The original tower was built in 1516 as part of the Walls of Amsterdam for the purpose of defending the city and the harbour. The top half, designed by Hendrick de Keyser, was extended to its current, decorative form in 1606. Since then the tower has been 48m tall.

Because the 3rd Duke of Alba proposed incorporating the tower into a castle (the Monte Albano) the tower became known in Dutch as the Monte Albano Toren. Over the years this became garbled to "Montelbaanstoren." The castle was never built.

== Gallery ==
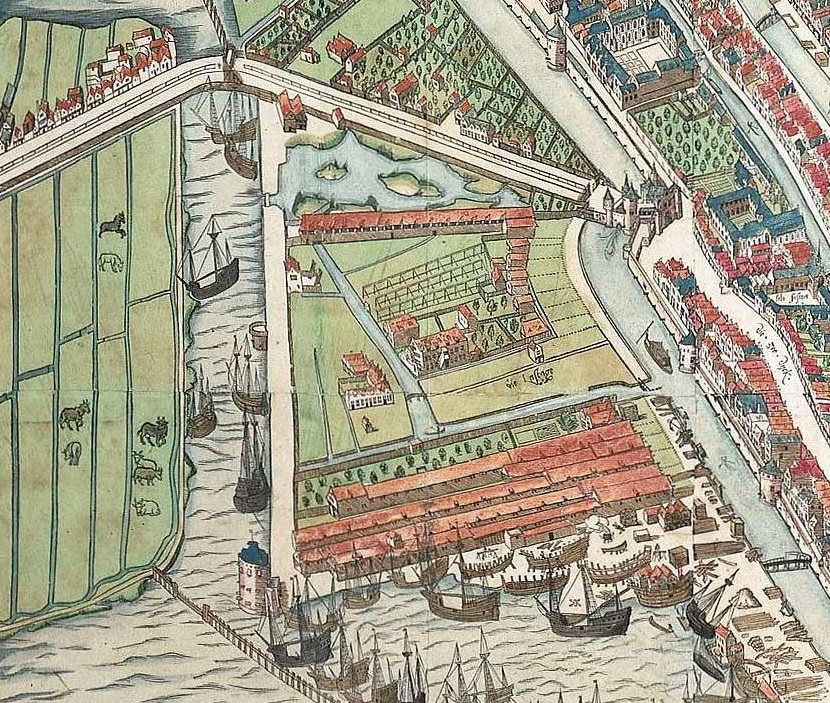
Eastern Amsterdam circa 1544, with Montelbaanstoren in the lower left corner

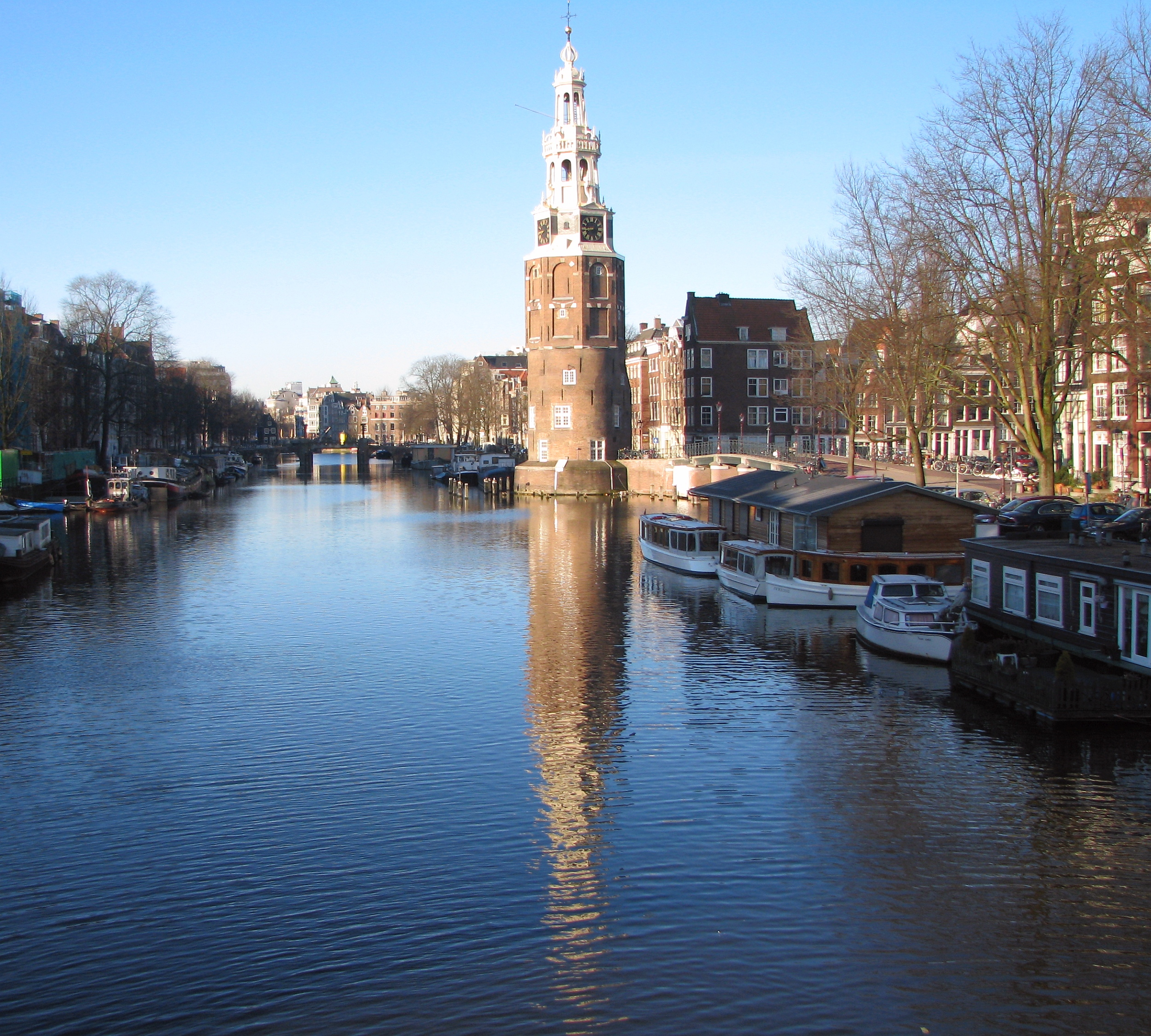
Montelbaan-Tower (built in 1516) at the Oude Schans

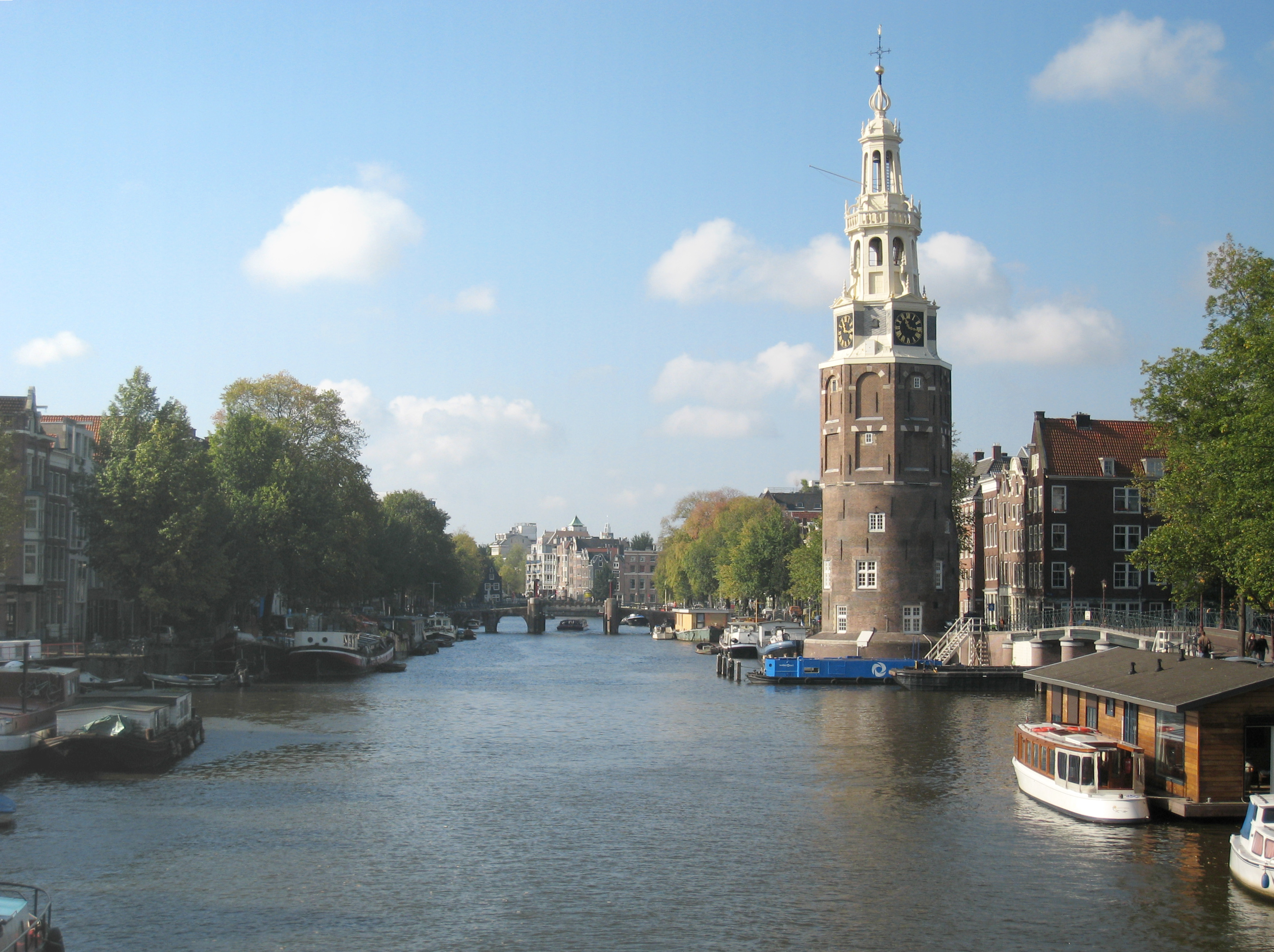
The Montelbaanstoren at the Oudeschans

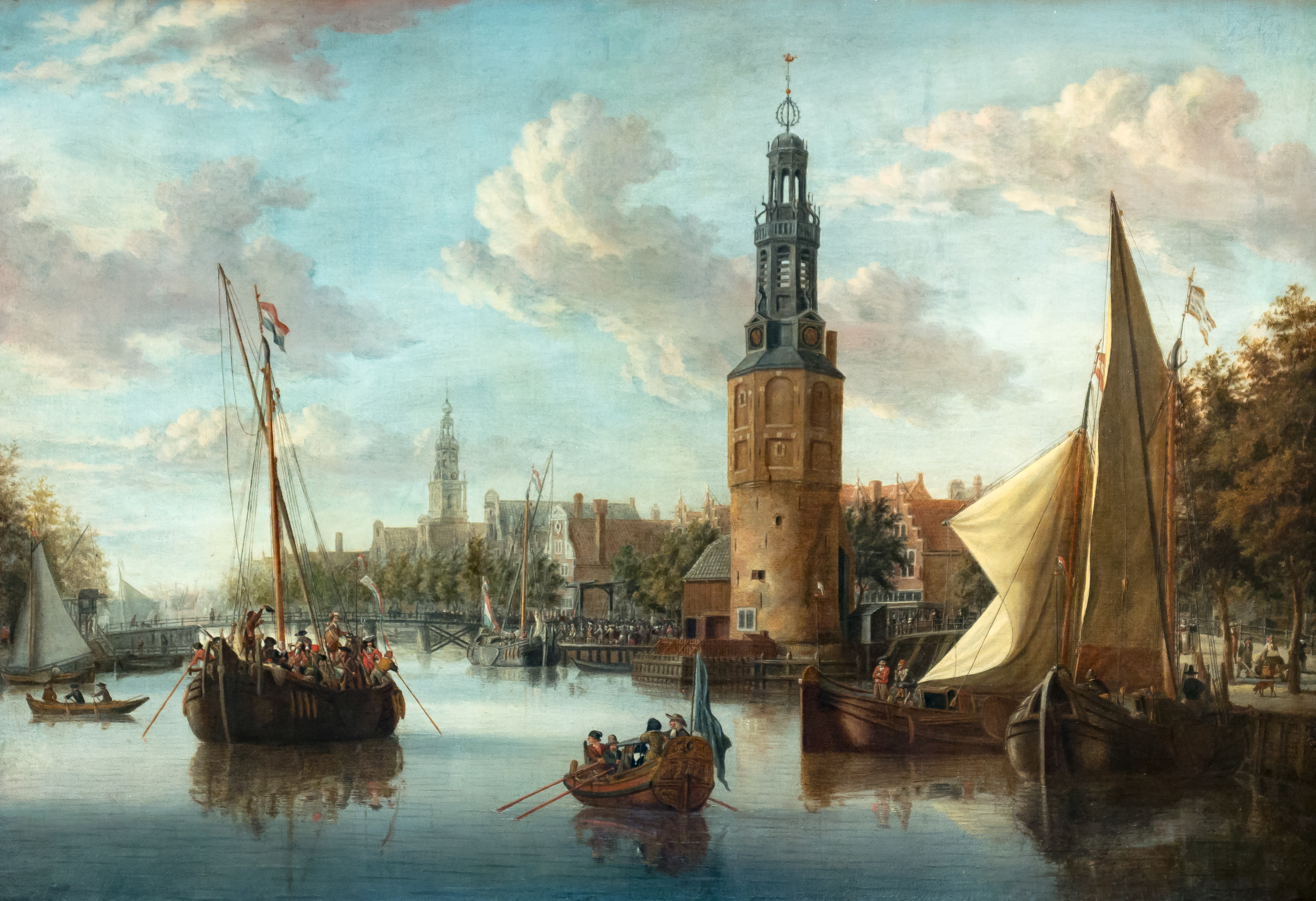
The tower in a painting from 1682 by Abraham Storck

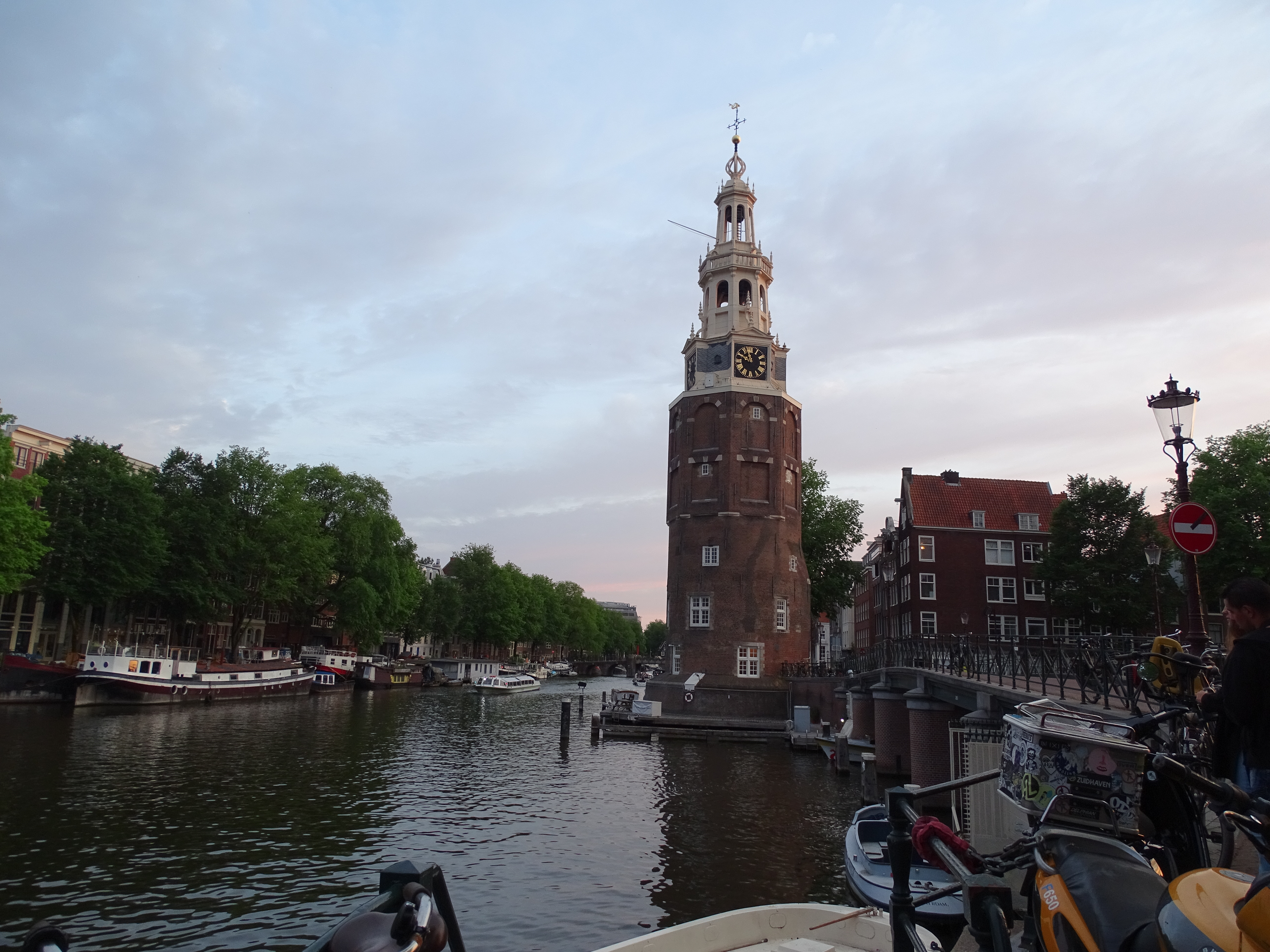
Montelbaanstoren with surrounding water.

== See also ==
- Munttoren
- Schreierstoren
