= Rechtboomssloot =

Canal in Amsterdam

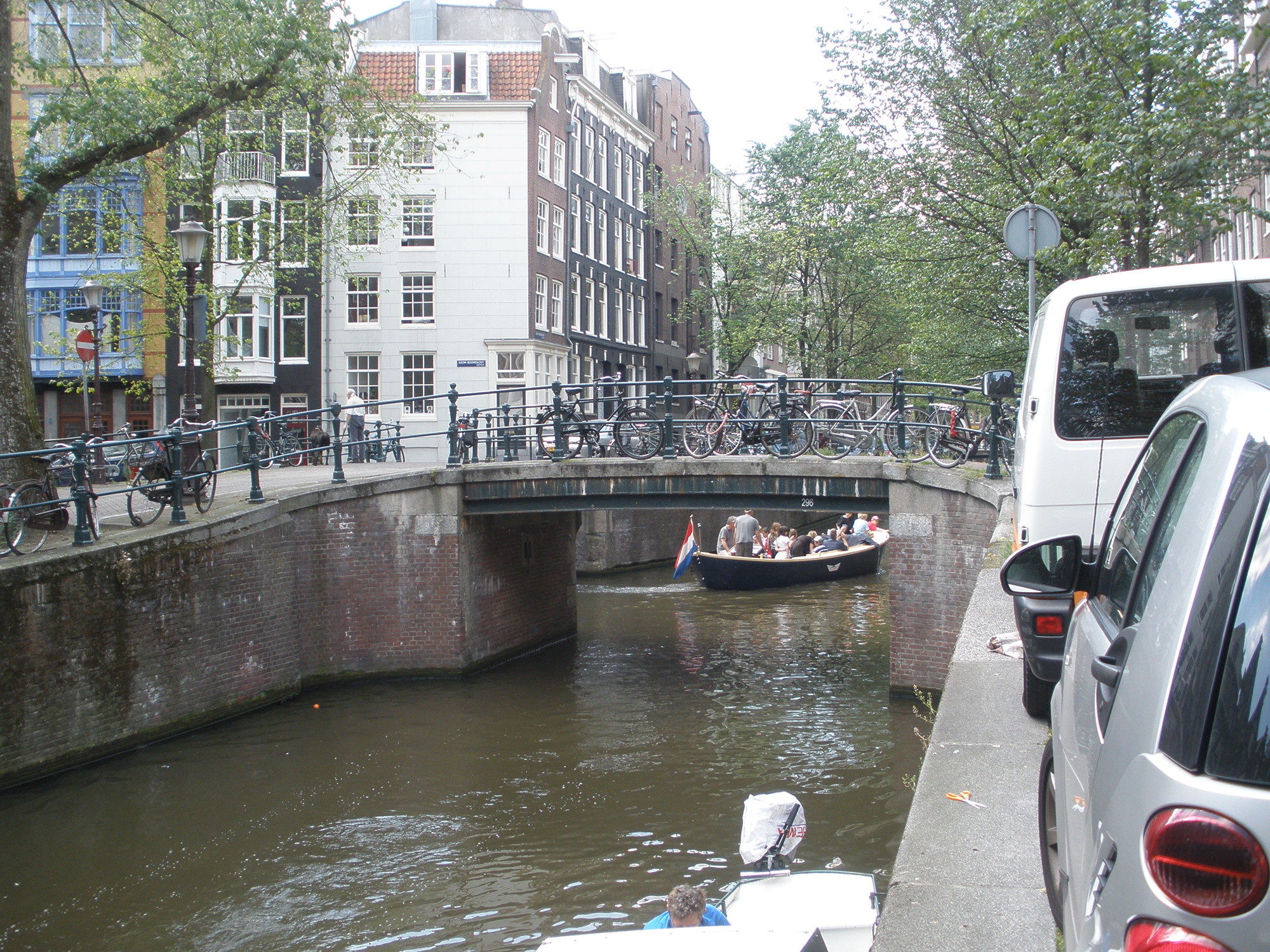
- Bridge over the Rechtboomssloot at the corner with the Kromboomssloot

- Location within Amsterdam
- Location: Amsterdam
- Postal code: 1011
- Coordinates: 52.372651°N 4.902607°E
- Northwest end: Geldersekade
- To: Oudeschans

The Rechtboomssloot, or Recht Boomssloot, is a canal in the Lastage (Nieuwmarktbuurt) neighborhood in the center of Amsterdam.

== Location ==
The Rechtboomssloot runs from the Geldersekade in a southeastern direction to the Oudeschans. There are three road bridges: two at the ends (bridge no. 297 and no. 288) and one halfway along the canal (bridge no. 296), where the Kromboomssloot ends at the Rechtboomssloot. There is also a pedestrian bridge ( no. 249) between Brandewijnsteeg and Lastageweg .

The Rechtboomssloot is partly located in Chinatown. The Fa Yin Chinese Association in the Netherlands has been located at Rechtboomssloot 5 since 1978. The association organizes Chinese language education and socio-cultural activities for Chinese elderly people. The St. Antoniusschool, a Roman Catholic primary school, is located on the Rechtboomssloot at the Lastageweg corner. The Boomsspijker neighborhood center at Rechtboomssloot 52 regularly hosts concerts, theater performances and exhibitions. The Jan de Liefdeschool, a primary school, used to be in this building.

There are a number of national monuments along the Rechtboomssloot such as De Rode Leeuw (1726), Recht Boomssloot 36-40 (18th century) and De Mouterij (19th century) at Recht Boomssloot 28 / Zakslootje 16.

== History ==
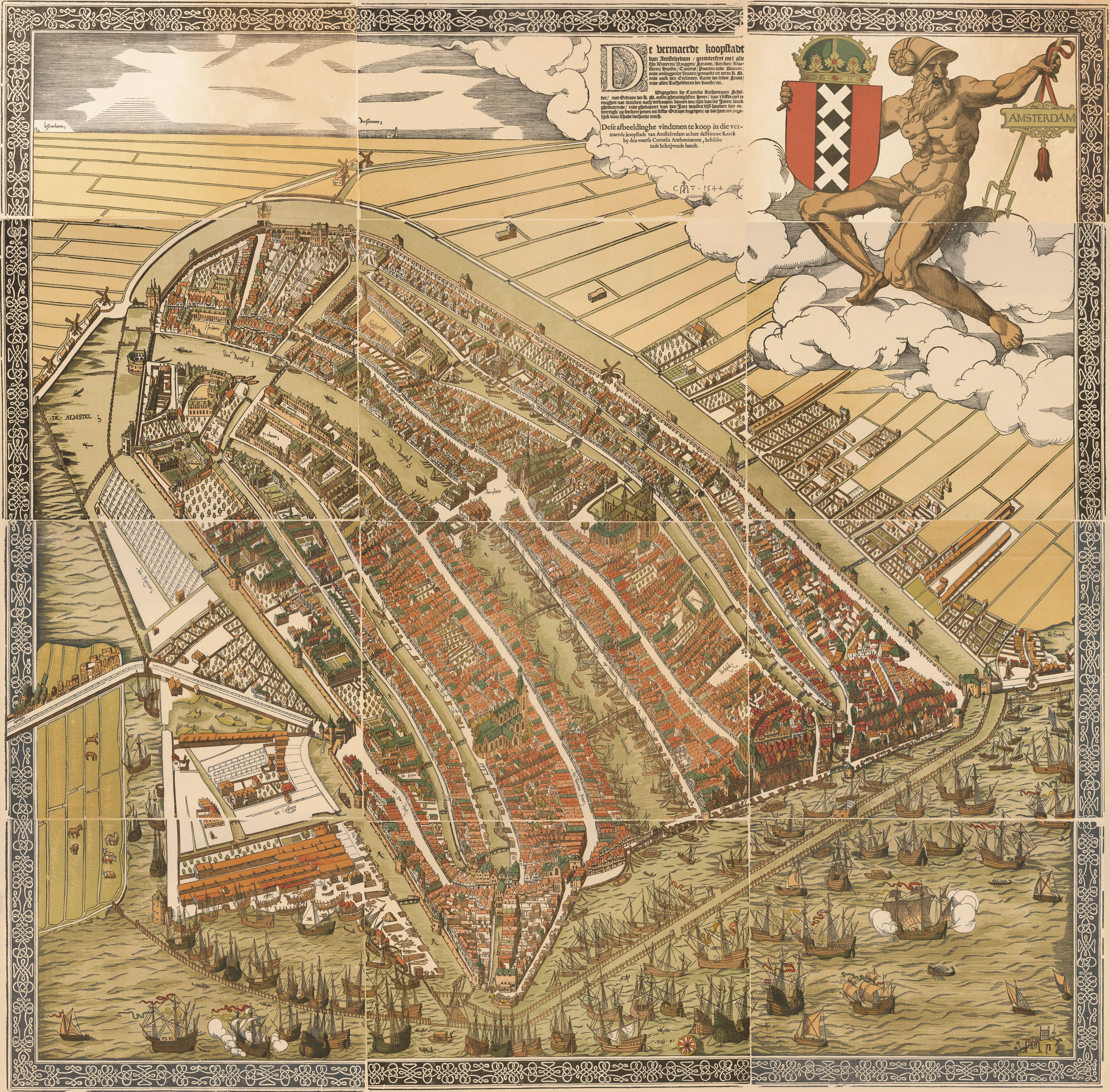
Bird's eye view of Amsterdam from the north by Cornelis Anthonisz. (1544). Lastage is to the east (lower left).

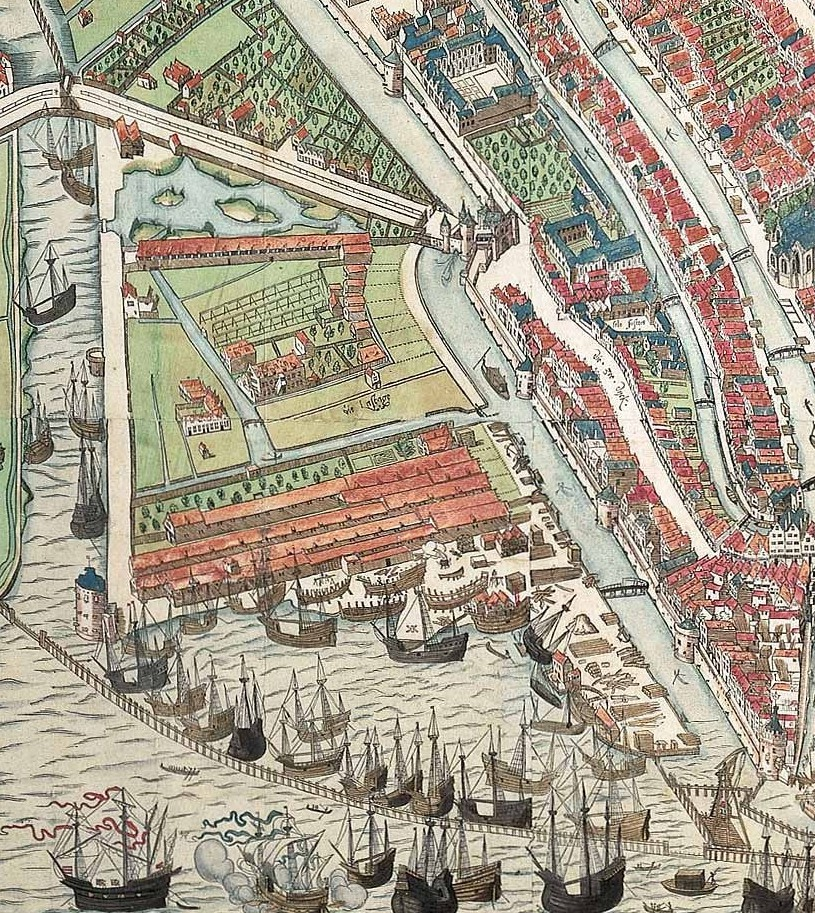
Detail of the Anthonisz map. showing the Lastage area. Rechtboomssloot runs between Oudeschans on the left and Geldersekade on the right.

The Rechtboomssloot dates from the first half of the 16th century. The canal is named after the 16th-century shipbuilder Cornelis Boom. Boom, who lived at the Rechtboomssloot (at numbers 1 to 3), had two ditches, the Rechtboomssloot and Kromboomssloot, widened into canals around 1530 to connect his shipyard on the Lastage with the IJ. The Kromboomssloot thereby became a cross-channel from the main Rechtboomssloot canal. As the names indicate, the Rechtboomssloot is completely straight while there is a bend in the Kromboomssloot.

The Lastage was outside the city walls at the time and was therefore under threat of attacks from the county of Guelders. When Boom was given permission to dig the Rechtboomssloot and Kromboomssloot, he had to allow the Rechtboomssloot to be closed in the event of danger, without the city having to pay compensation to Boom for this. In 1538 the canal was closed due to an impending attack by Guelders. Boom litigated as high as the Hof van Holland (High Court) in Brussels to keep his canal open. In 1565, on the advice of William the Silent, the Court ruled that the gates should remain open on at least one side during the day, so that free movement by water remained possible.

The expansion of the city moved further and further to the east and the Lastage area soon became involved in the growing city. Around 1589, houses began to be built on plots that been purchased by the city south of the Rechtboomssloot.

In the 17th century the "In den witte Haen" brewery was on the westernmost part of the Kromboomssloot. Large storage cellars were built under the brewery for water that was supplied by boat. The brewery was demolished around 1880 and replaced by houses. During renovation of one of these houses in the early 1970s, these storage cellars were found and were completely excavated.

The "De Haan & Sleutels" beer brewery was located on the Rechtboomssloot until it moved in 1890, after which PJA Chrispijn purchased the 1,400 square metres (15,000 sq ft) complex and established a winery, distillery and liquor distillery in it. From headquarters at the Rechtboomssloot and 18 stores in Amsterdam, Chrispijn sold well-known drinks such as Nassaubitter, Oranjebitter and Advocaat. Chrispijn was bought by Lucas Bols in 1953 and moved to Oudezijds Voorburgwal 234.

In 1994 the municipality proposed a plan to dig up the trees on the Kromboomssloot and Rechtboomssloot. The plan was canceled after protests by residents.

== Gallery ==
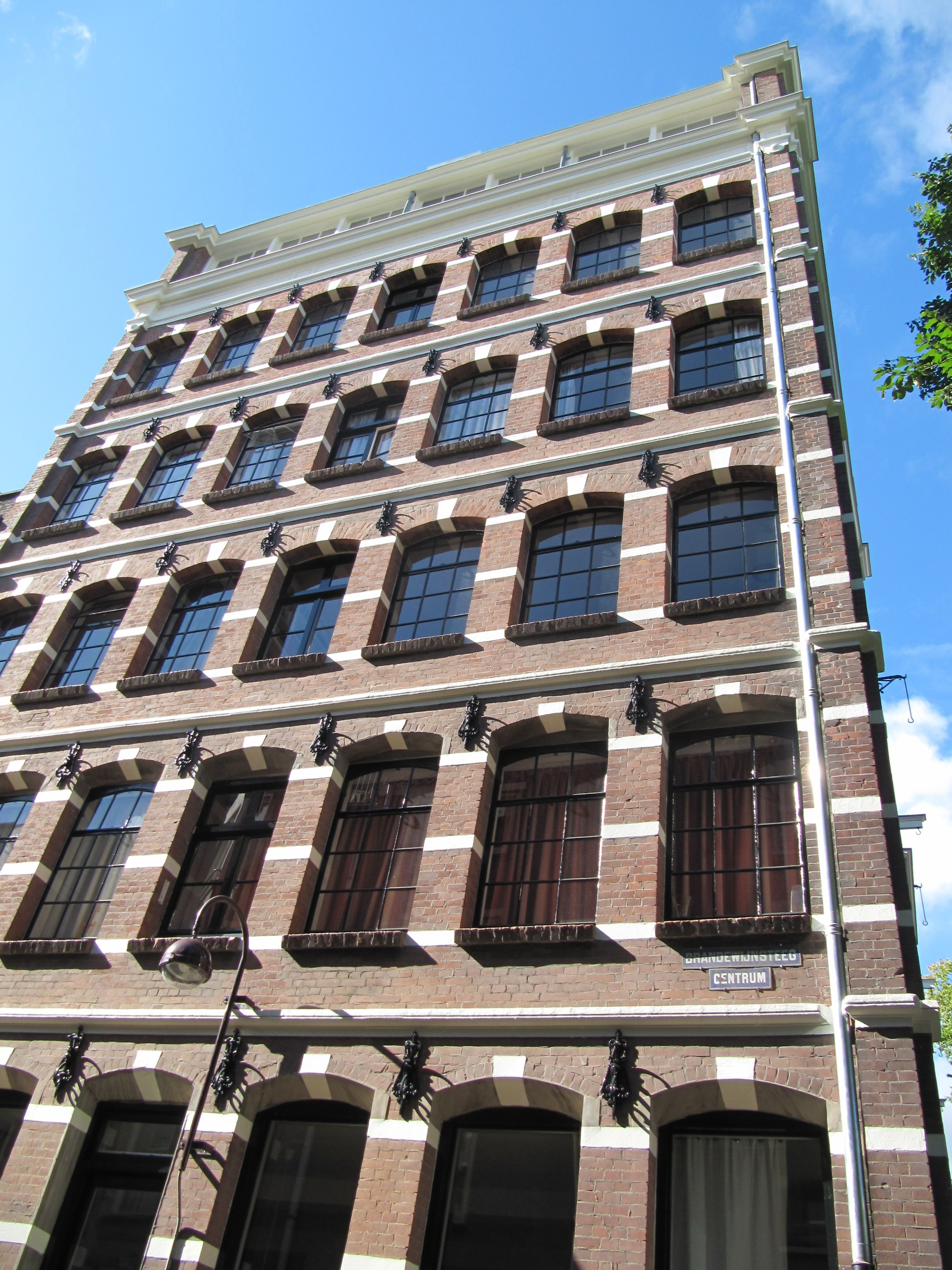
Former diamond cutting mill

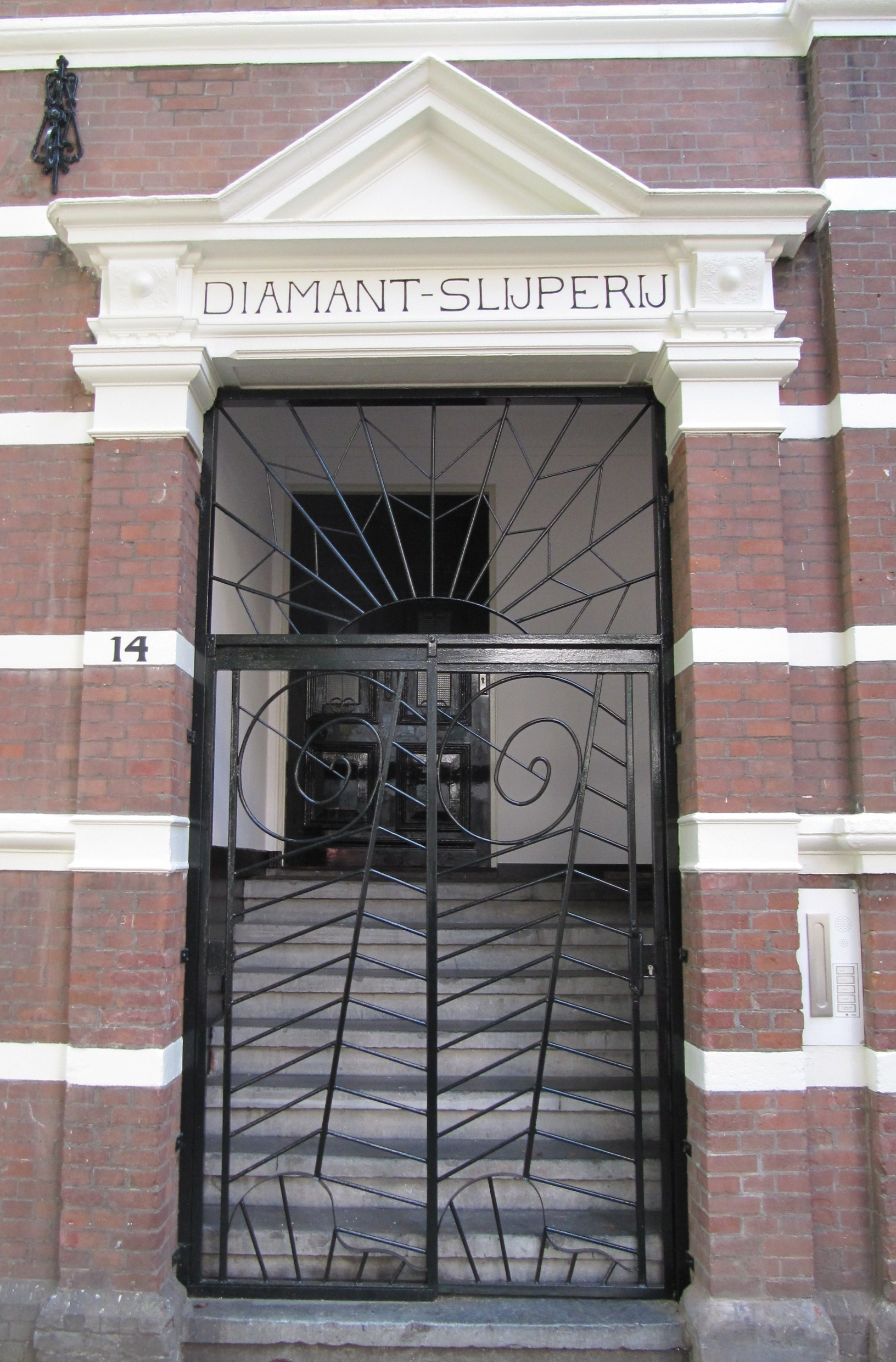
Entrance to diamond cutting mill

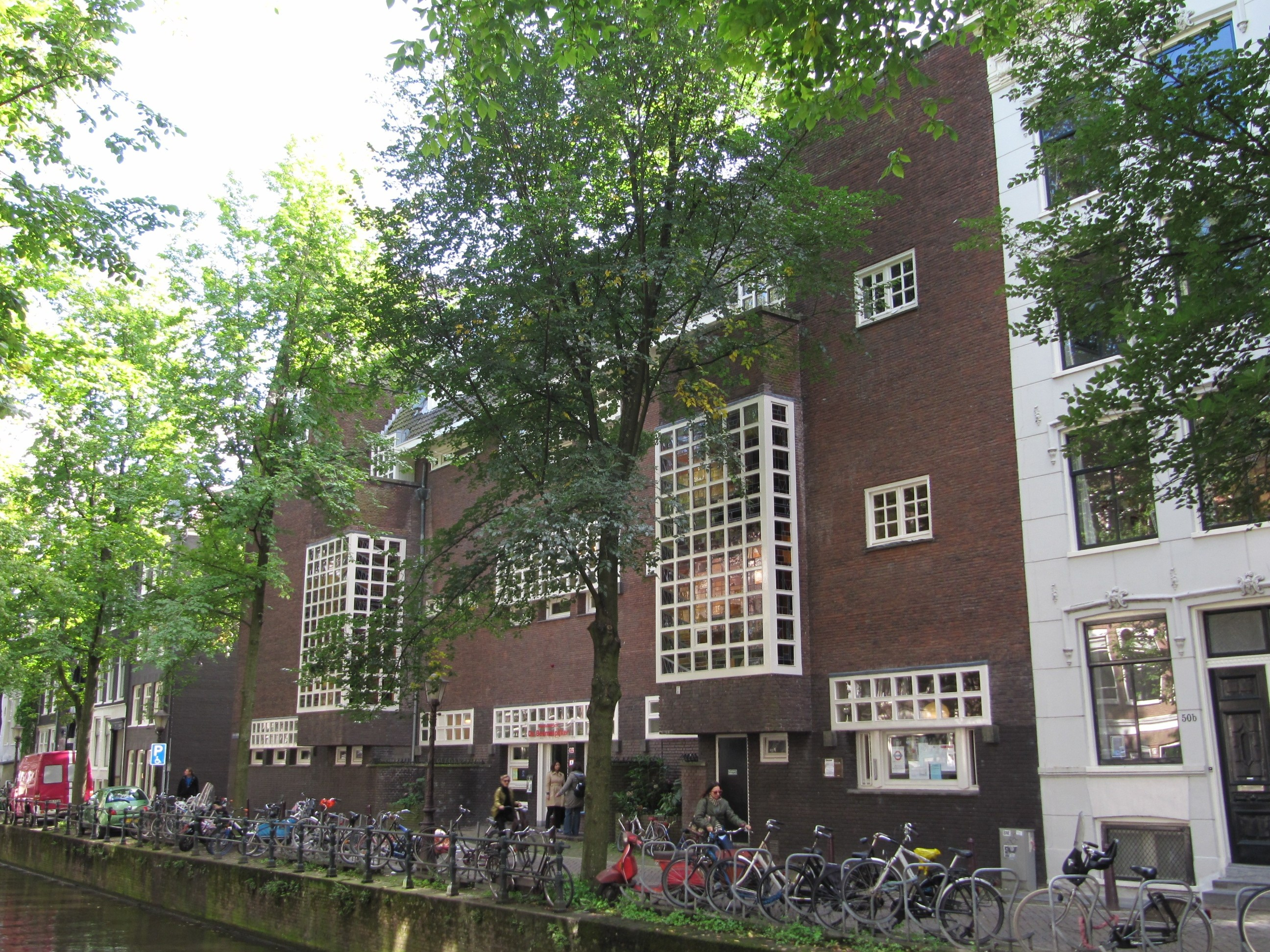
Former Jan de Liefde school

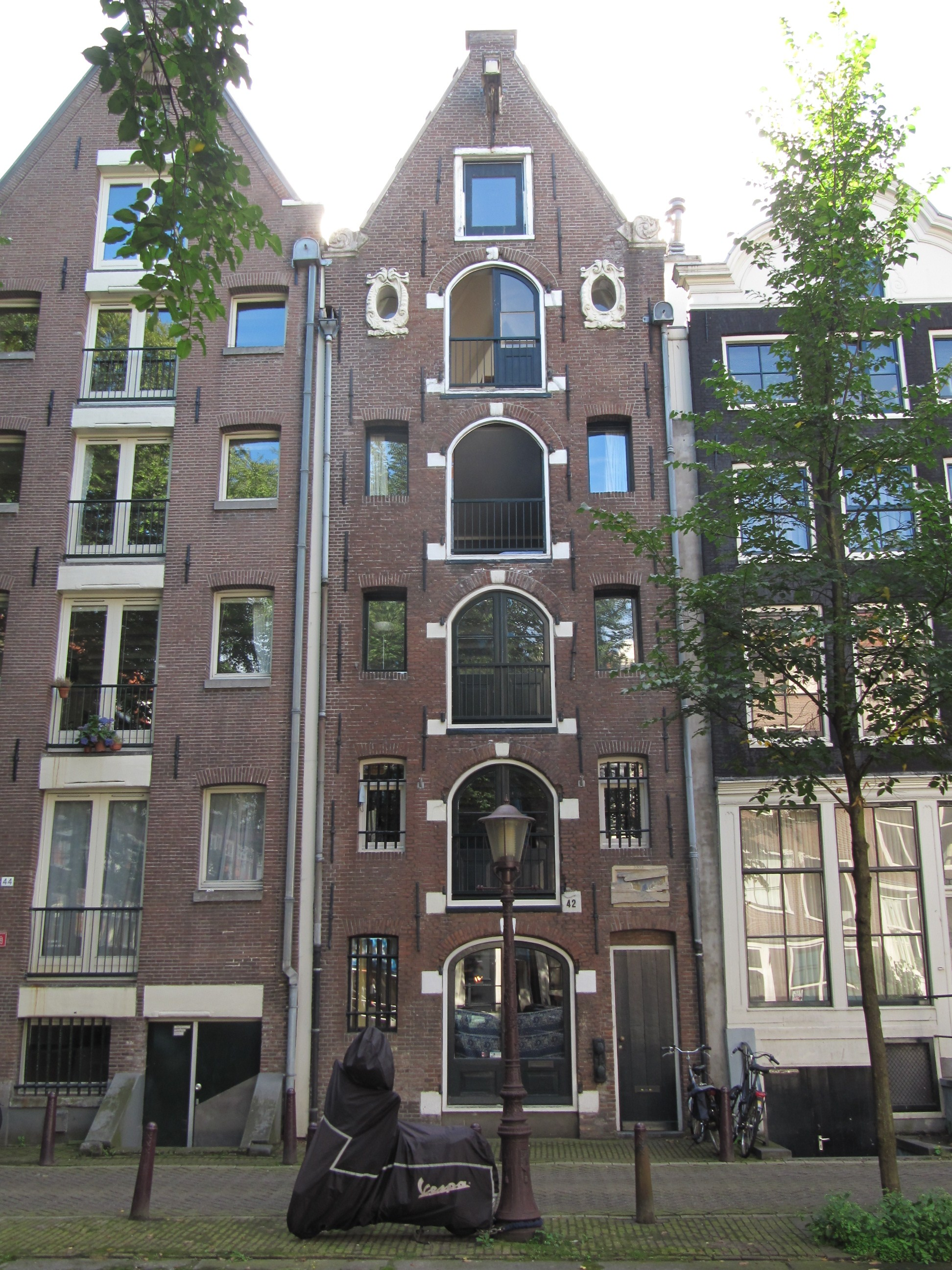
Warehouse

== See also ==
- Canals of Amsterdam
