= Kromboomssloot =

Canal in Amsterdam

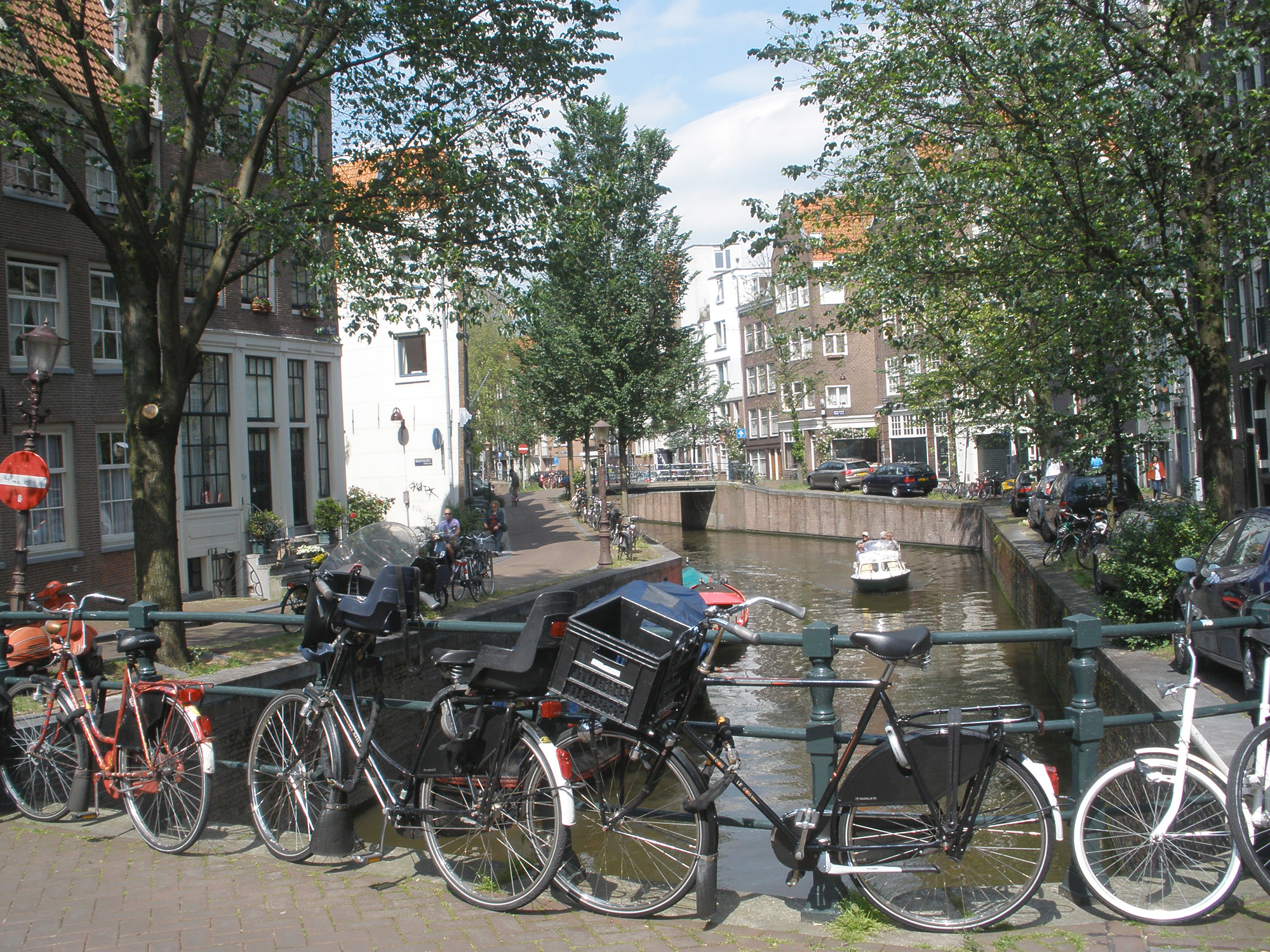
- The Kromboomssloot, looking northeast towards the bend that makes the canal crooked.

- Location within Amsterdam
- Location: Amsterdam
- Postal code: 1011
- Coordinates: 52.371389°N 4.902222°E
- East end: Rechtboomssloot
- To: Snoekjesgracht

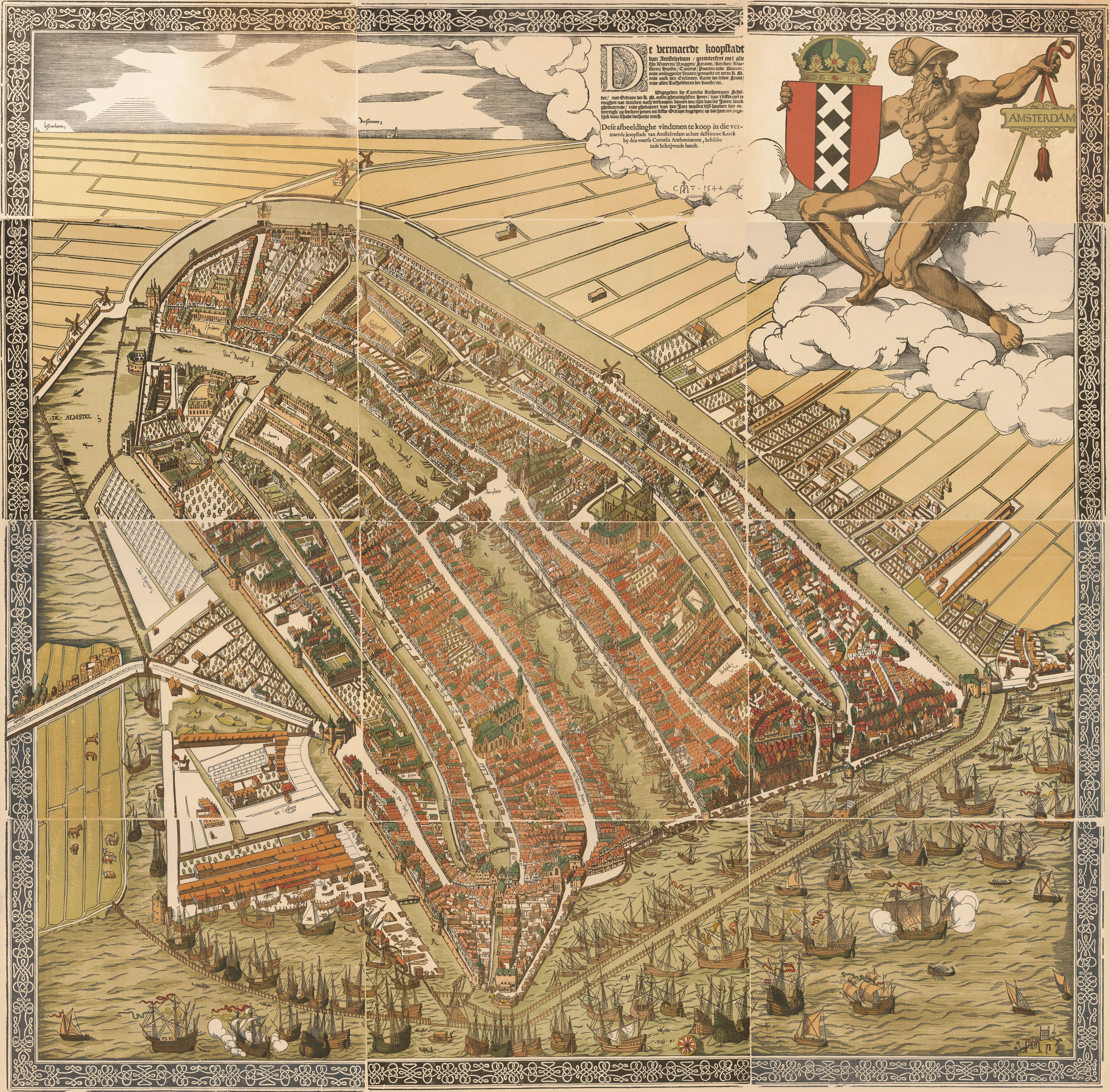
The Kromboomssloot at the bottom left on the map by Cornelis Anthonisz. (1544)

The Kromboomssloot, or Krom Boomssloot, is a canal in the Lastage (Nieuwmarktbuurt) neighborhood in the center of Amsterdam. It provides a transverse navigation from the Rechtboomssloot and was previously called Dwarsboomssloot. As the names indicate, the Rechtboomssloot (Straight Boom Ditch) is completely straight, while there is a curve in the Kromboomssloot (Crooked Boom Ditch).

The canal was chosen in 2007 as one of the most beautiful streets in Amsterdam.

== Description ==
The Kromboomssloot runs from the Rechtboomssloot in a southwestern direction to a bend where the canal changes into the Snoekjesgracht and leads to the Oudeschans canal. At this bend there is a square with benches and a pillar-shaped artwork by Wim Tap from 1989.

The canal has four bridges: bridge no. 295 at the corner with the Rechtboomssloot, bridge no. 292 between Koningsstraat and Korte Koningsstraat, bridge no. 293 between Keizersstraat and Korte Keizersstraat and bridge no. 290 between Dijkstraat and Korte Dijkstraat.

== History ==
The Kromboomssloot is about five centuries old. The canal is named after the 16th-century landowner and shipbuilder Cornelis Boom. Both the Kromboomssloot and Rechtboomssloot were originally ditches that were commissioned by Cornelis Boom to be widened into canals to connect his shipyard on the Lastage with the IJ.

In 1994 the municipality proposed a plan to dig up the trees on the Kromboomssloot and Rechtboomssloot. However, this plan was canceled after protests by residents.

== Famous buildings ==
=== Schottenburch ===
Schottenburch is said to be the oldest existing warehouse in Amsterdam. It is certainly one of the oldest warehouses in the city. Schottenburch has a gable stone with the date 1636, but the building can already be seen on the city map of Amsterdam from 1595 made by Pieter Bast. It is a double warehouse with spout facades and shutters at Kromboomssloot 18–20. Pakhuis de Schottenburch was an artists' initiative from 1979 to 1988. Exhibitions, performances, theater, art events (including "Closer to the Images" and "Art or Pornography?") and music performances were organized by visual artist Wim Vonk, who organized the Schottenburch artists' initiative.

Schottenburch now houses residences, a gallery and a wine trader.

=== Armenian Apostolic Church ===
The Armenian-Apostolic Church opened its doors in a former warehouse on the Kromboomssloot in 1714. In 1749 the church was expanded and embellished with, among other things, a frame around the outside door. The church remained in use until 1806. The building was sold in 1874, but in 1989, following the arrival of a new wave of believers from, among others, Turkey, it was bought back and re-used as a church building. In August 2008 a renovation started that would last two years. The upper floors are likely to have a cultural or museum destination.

=== De Oude Jumbo ===
De Oude Jumbo is a complex of five contiguous buildings on Kromboomssloot and Oudeschans, four of which (two from the 17th century and two from the 18th century) have been designated as national monuments. In this complex, game manufacturer Jumbo developed well-known games such as Stratego. In 2006, Jumbo left the five buildings and moved to Zaandam. After this, the complex was converted into apartments, whereby the densely built up inner gardens were opened up again and the original rear facades were restored.

=== De Branderij ===
The Branderij, the former coffee roasting factory of Alex Meijer & Co., was designed in the early 20th century by architect Emanuel Marcus Rood (1851-1929). The sober art nouveau style building is now a municipal monument.

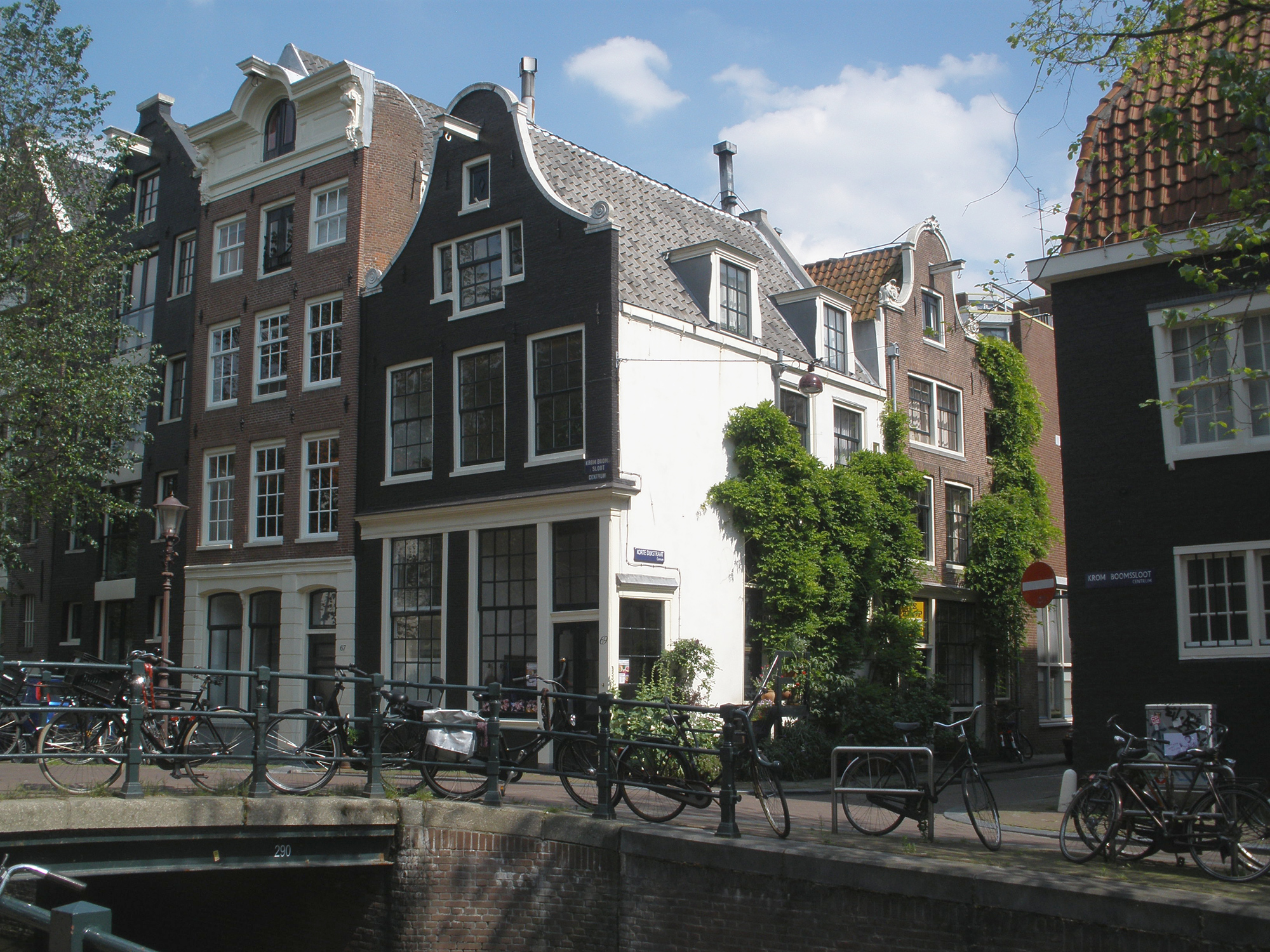
Canal houses on the Kromboomssloot, corner of Korte Dijkstraat.

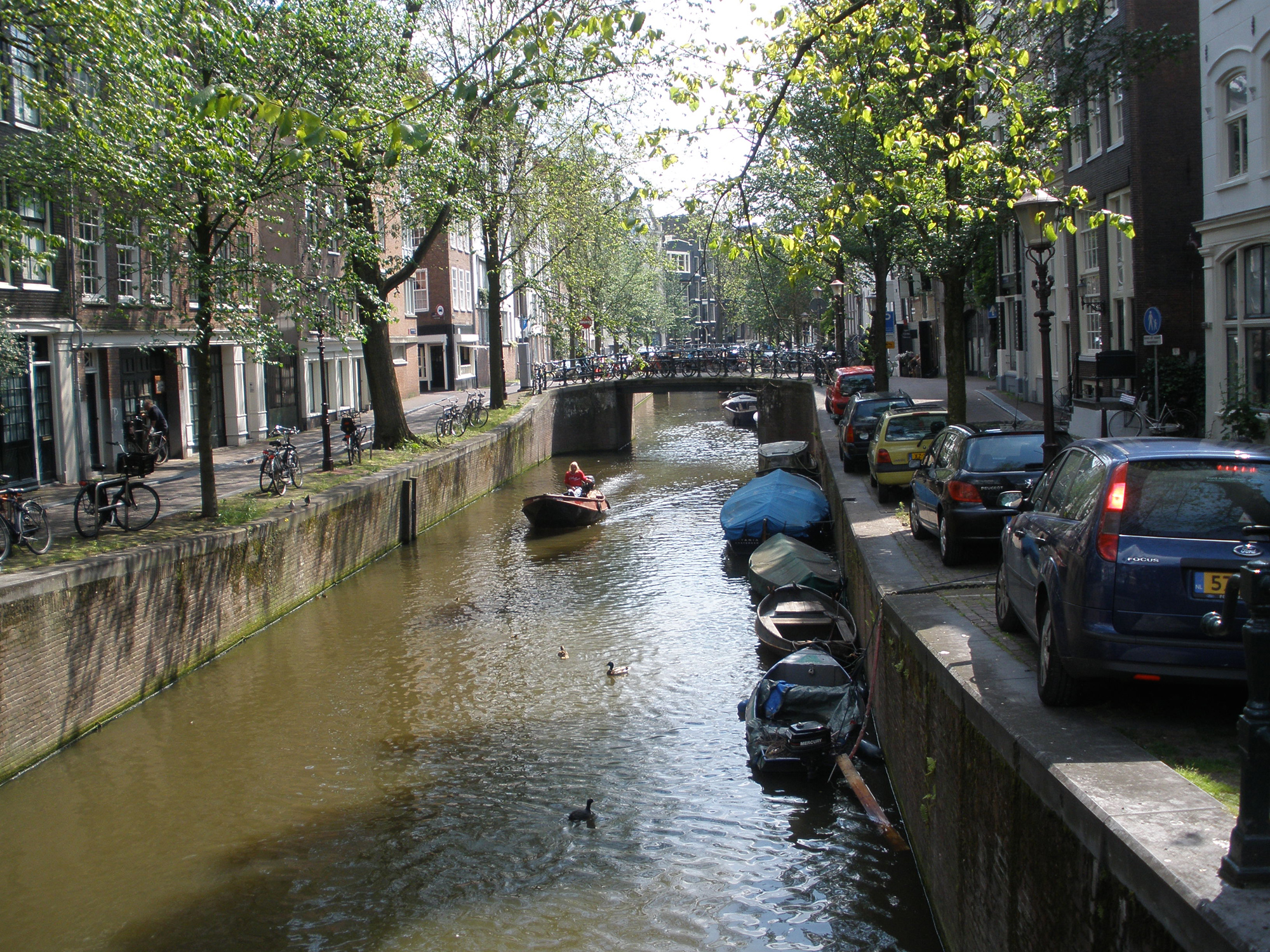
Kromboomssloot

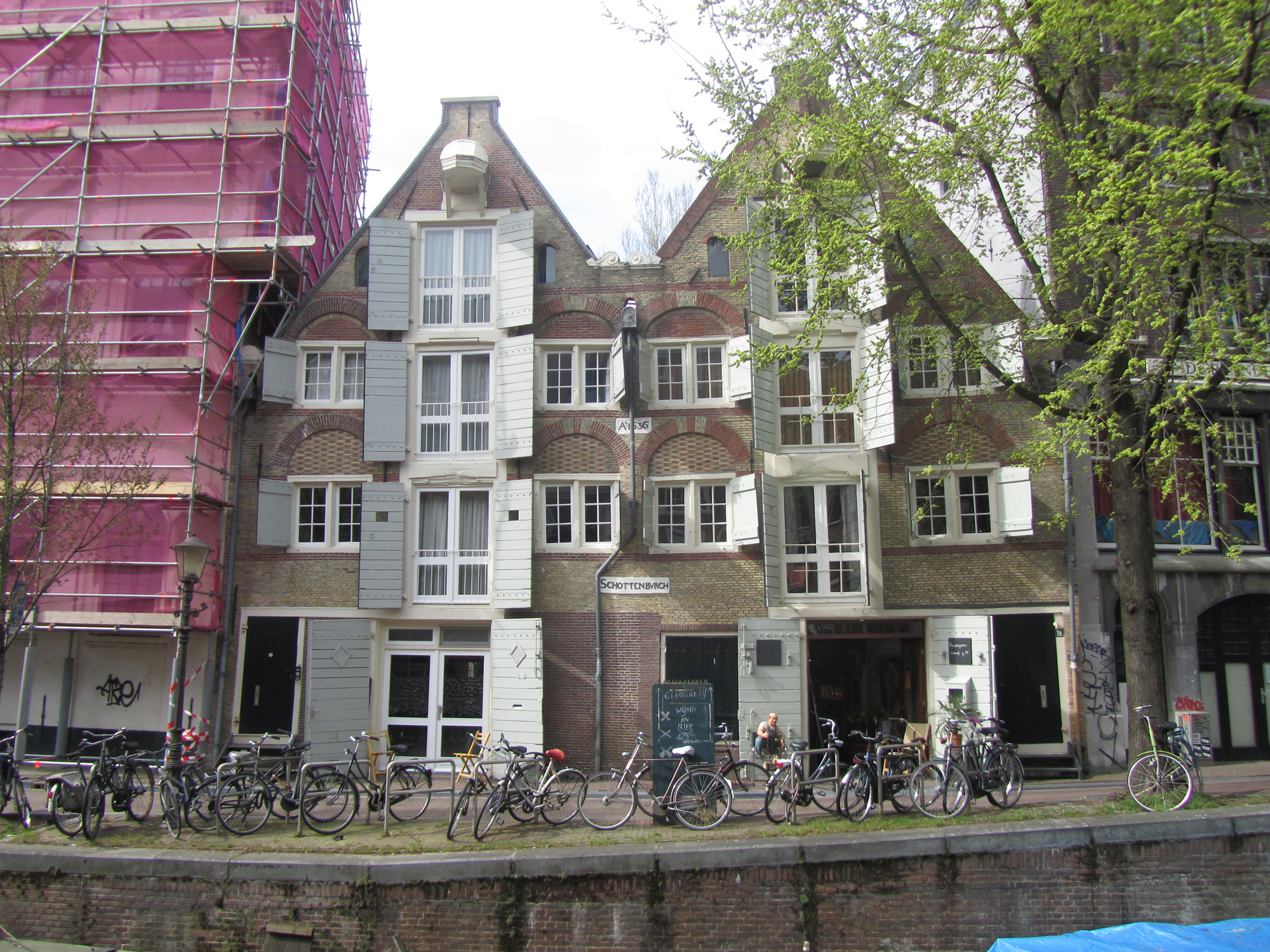
Schottenburch

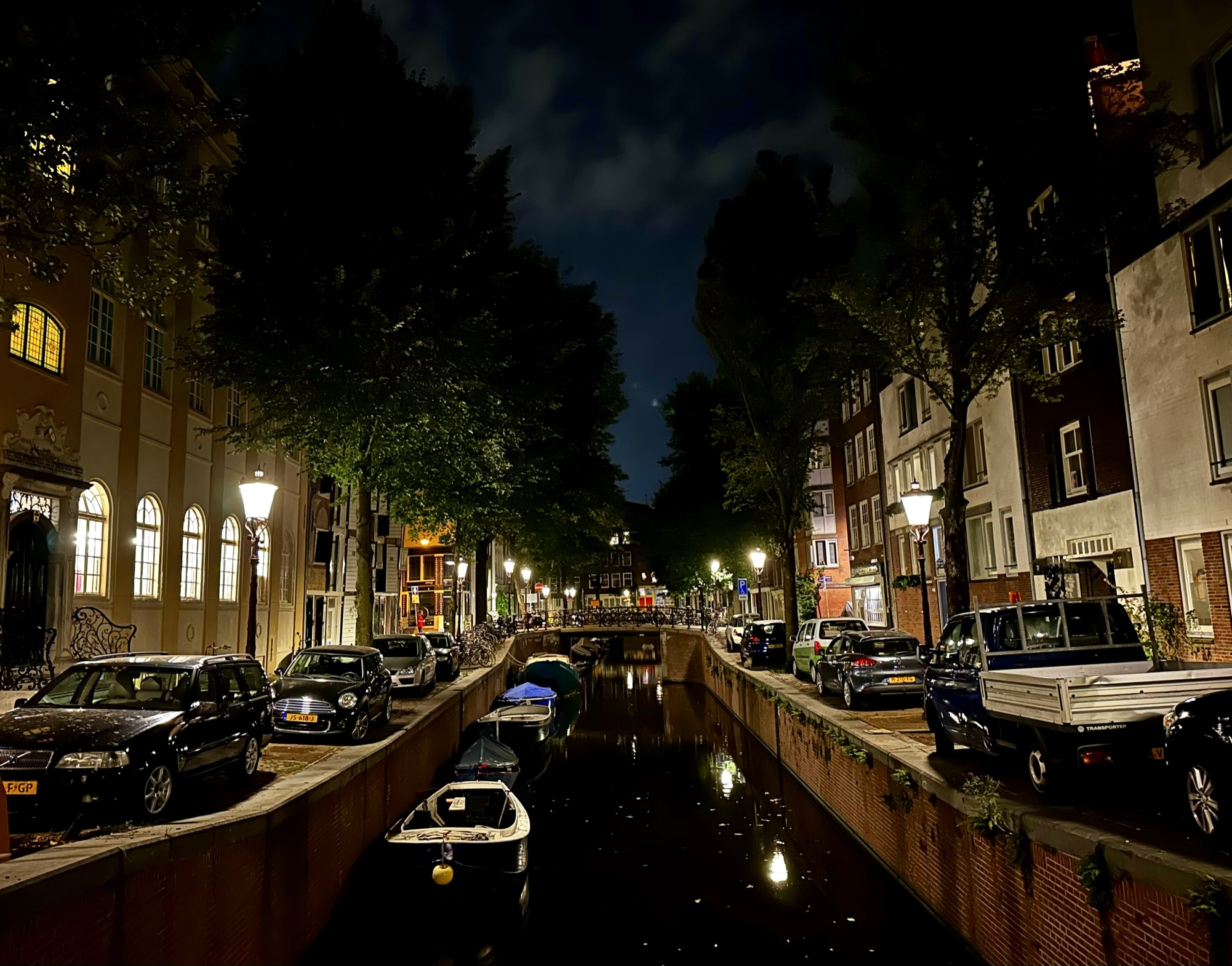
Kromboomssloot at night

== See also ==
- Canals of Amsterdam
