= Geldersekade =

Canal in Amsterdam

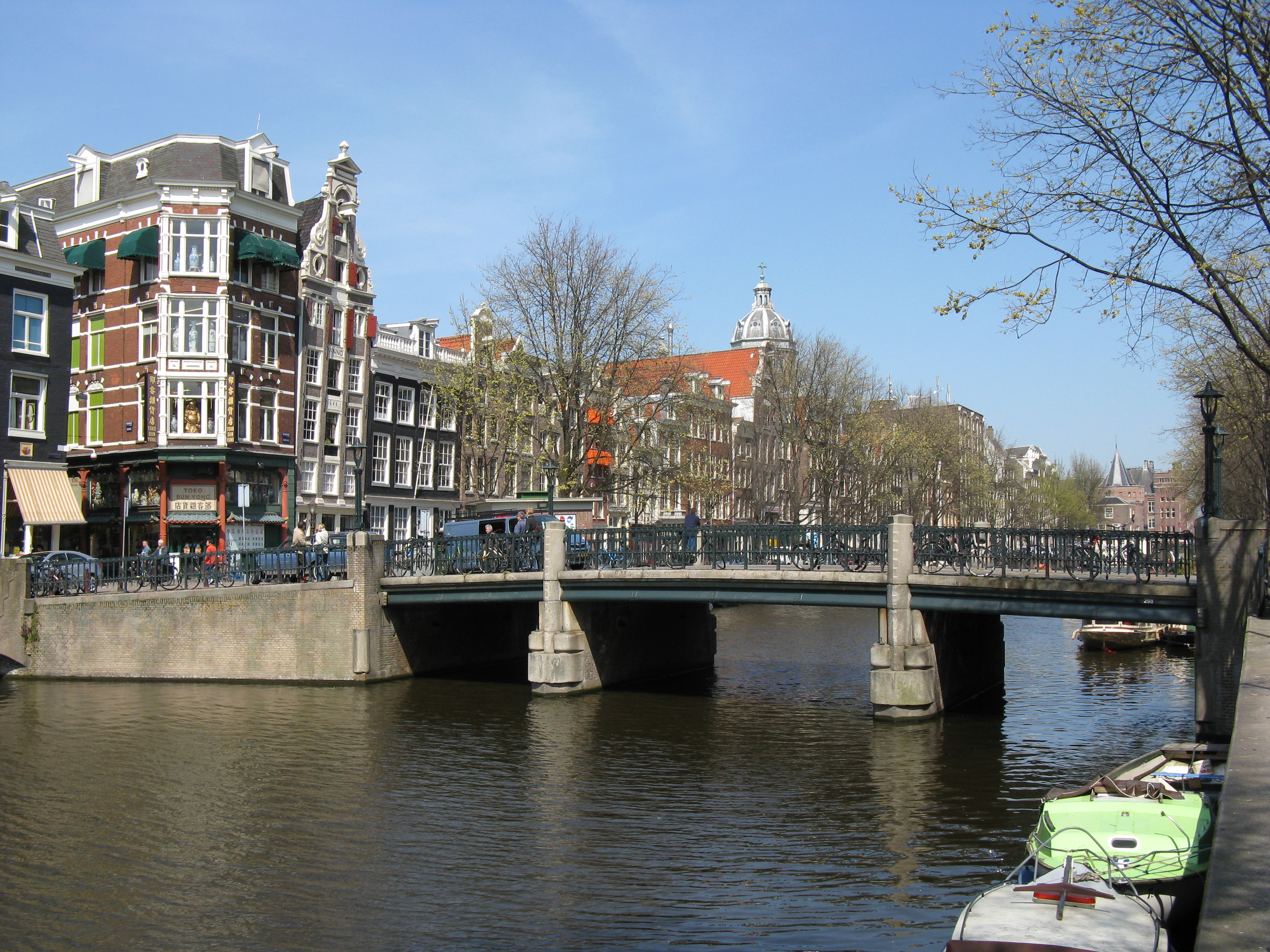
- Geldersekade with bridge 298

- Location within Amsterdam
- Location: Amsterdam
- Postal code: 1011, 1012
- Coordinates: 52.374867°N 4.901612°E
- North end: Kolkswaterkering (flood barrier)
- To: Nieuwmarkt

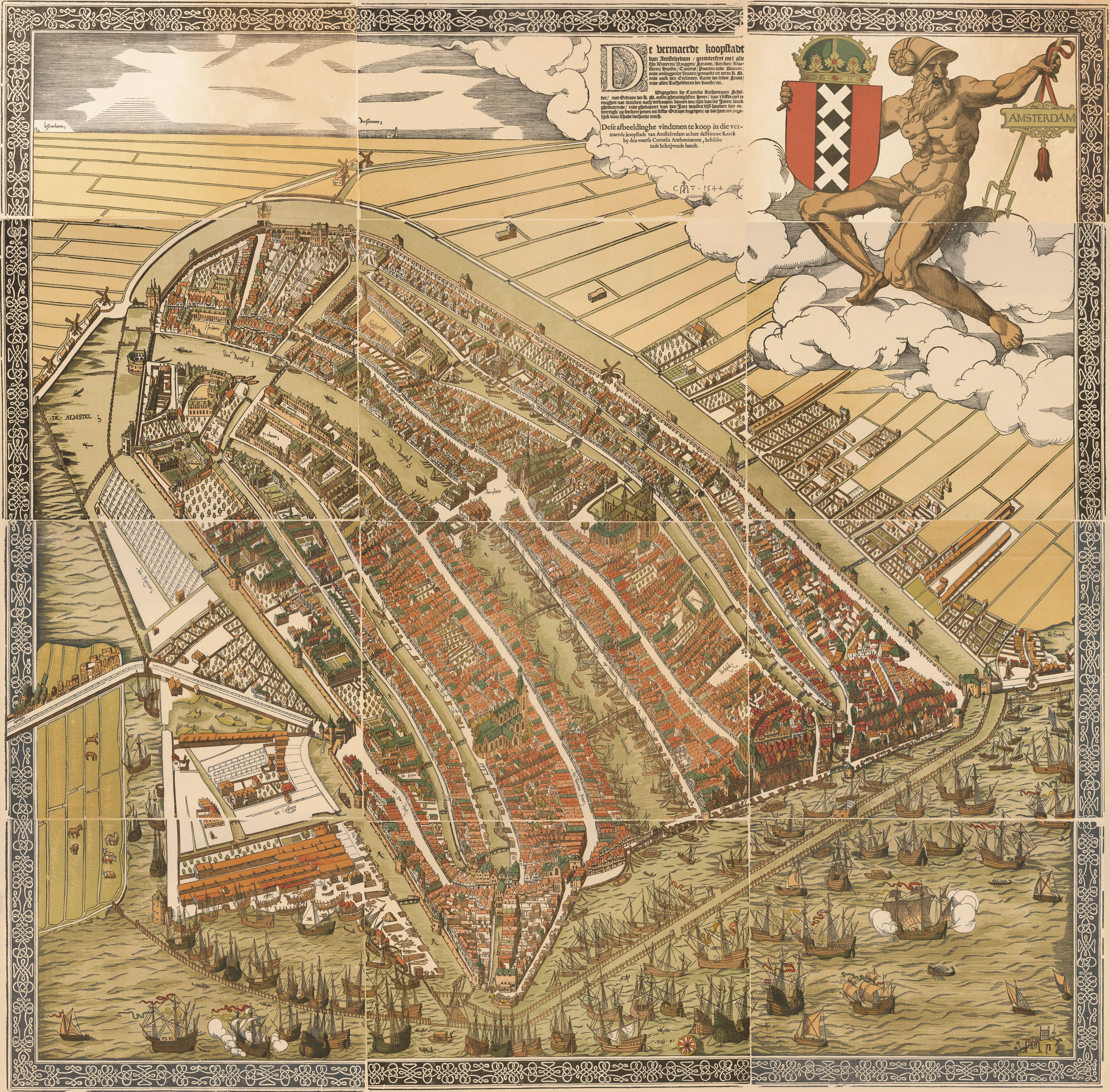
De Geldersekade linksonder op de Vogelvluchtkaart van Cornelis Anthonisz uit 1544.

The Geldersekade is a canal and a street in Amsterdam that connects the Nieuwmarkt with the Prins Hendrikkade. The Geldersekade is in the easternmost part of De Wallen, the red light district, and borders Chinatown.

== Location ==
To the west, Elleboogsteeg, Stormsteeg and Waterpoortsteeg streets run between the even-numbered side of the Geldersekade and Zeedijk. To the east, Smidssteeg, Geldersesteeg, Waalsteeg, Binnen Bantammerstraat and Nieuwe Jonkerstraat run between the odd-numbered side and Rechtboomssloot.

The monumental house Het Tabaksvat, at Geldersekade 8, was originally a 17th-century merchant's house. The facade is from the last quarter of the 18th century. The interior was used for storage by the ships supply firm J. & J. Vinke, later the Ship Chandlers Warehouse.

== History ==
The Geldersekade was part of the city moat dug at the end of the 15th century that, together with the Kloveniersburgwal and the Singel, formed the Stedegracht around the city. The Geldersekade ran north from Sint Antoniespoort (now the Waag) on the Nieuwmarkt to the Schreierstoren on the IJ. A city wall was built on the city side, the western bank of the Geldersekade. This is clearly visible on the 1544 bird's-eye view map of Amsterdam by Cornelis Anthonisz. The eastern part, which was outside the city until 1585, was called the Cologne quay and then the Gelderland quay, and also the London quay or English quay for a short time. The names arose because there were jetties here where the ships from Gelderland, Cologne and England moored.

The Geldersekade lost its function as a moat after the Nieuwe Gracht (the current Oude Schans) was dug and new city walls were built. The old city wall was demolished and houses were built. The Lastage was developed between the Geldersekade and the Oudeschans.

A fish market was built after 1840 in the water of the Geldersekade, on the north side of the Nieuwmarkt. It replaced the fish market on Dam Square, which had to make way for the Beurs van Zocher. The scaffolding and wooden sheds were replaced in 1862 by the stone Gemeentelijke Vishal, which was demolished in 1938.

The entire quay has been called Geldersekade since 3 April 1912. In addition, the nearby Leliestraatje was given the name Geldersesteeg.

== Bridges ==
- Gelderschebrug, bridge no. 297, is across the Recht Boomssloot / corner of Geldersekade.
- Bantammer Bridge, bridge No. 298, connects the Binnen Bantammerstraat with the Stormsteeg.
- Hoofdbrug, bridge no. 299, is located over the Geldersekade at the Prins Hendrikkade.
- Kolkswaterkering, bridge no. 301, borders the Geldersekade at the Oudezijds Kolk / Prins Hendrikkade corner.

There is also a diver bridge (495) in the Nieuwmarkt, the Bijleveldschesluis, over the water connection with the Kloveniersburgwal.

== Traffic ==
Until October 1980, the east side of the Geldersekade was an important through route, also for public transport. From 1905 to 1942, tram line 8 ran over the quay. After the war, tram line 26 (1946–48) and tram line 11 ran successively along the quay until 1955. After that it was a bus route with very intensive bus traffic from the early 1970s, especially for the bus line to the Bijlmer. After the opening of the metro to Amsterdam Centraal station in 1980, the east side of the Geldersekade was re-profiled. It was no longer suitable for bus traffic, which now had to pass through Valkenburgerstraat. Today it is an important cycle route.

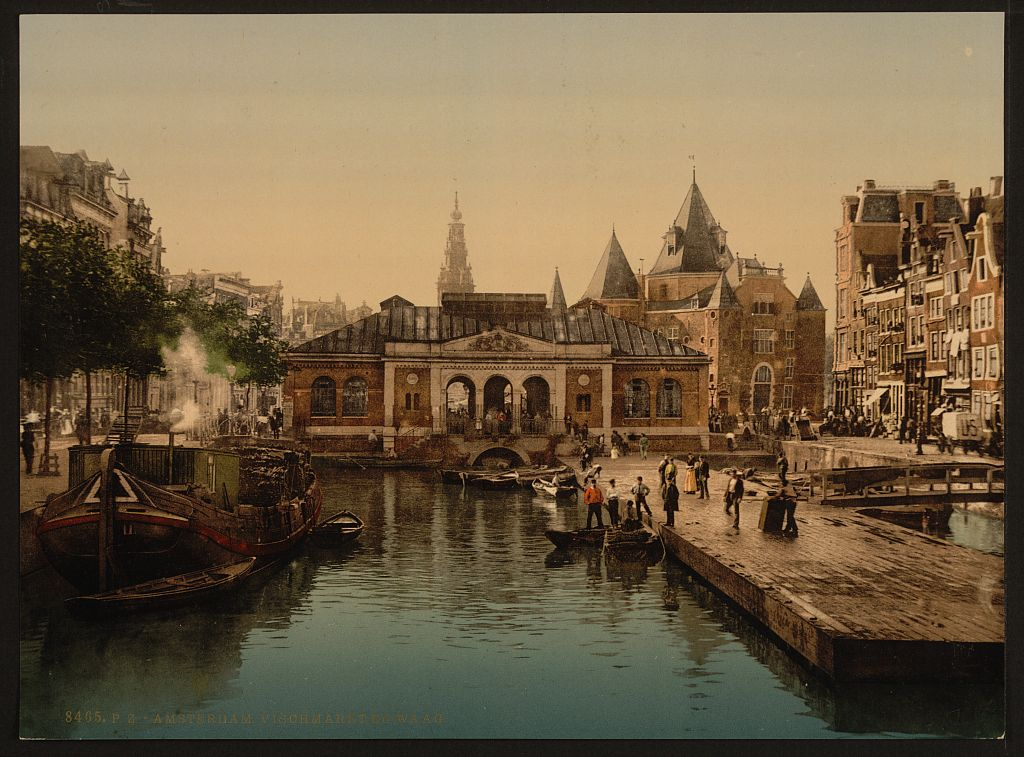
Fishmarket and weighing house c. 1895

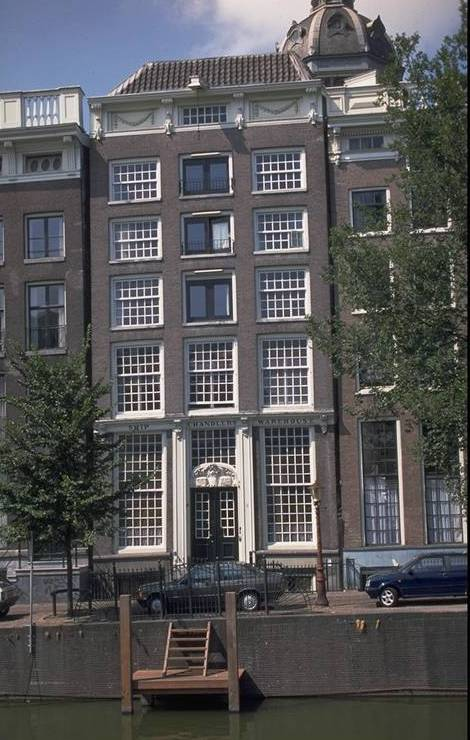
Geldersekade 8, The Tabaksvat (±1775).

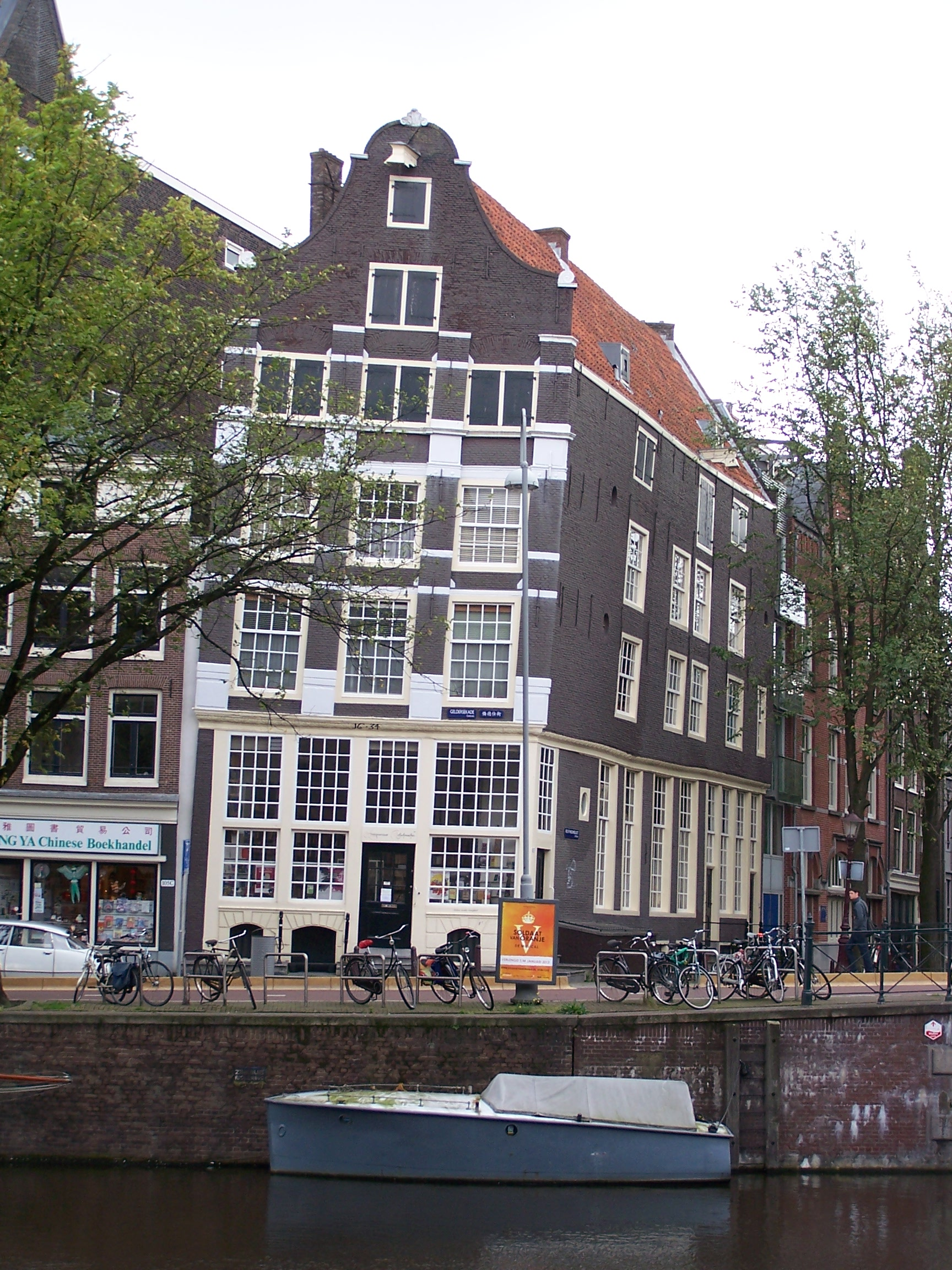
Geldersekade 107.

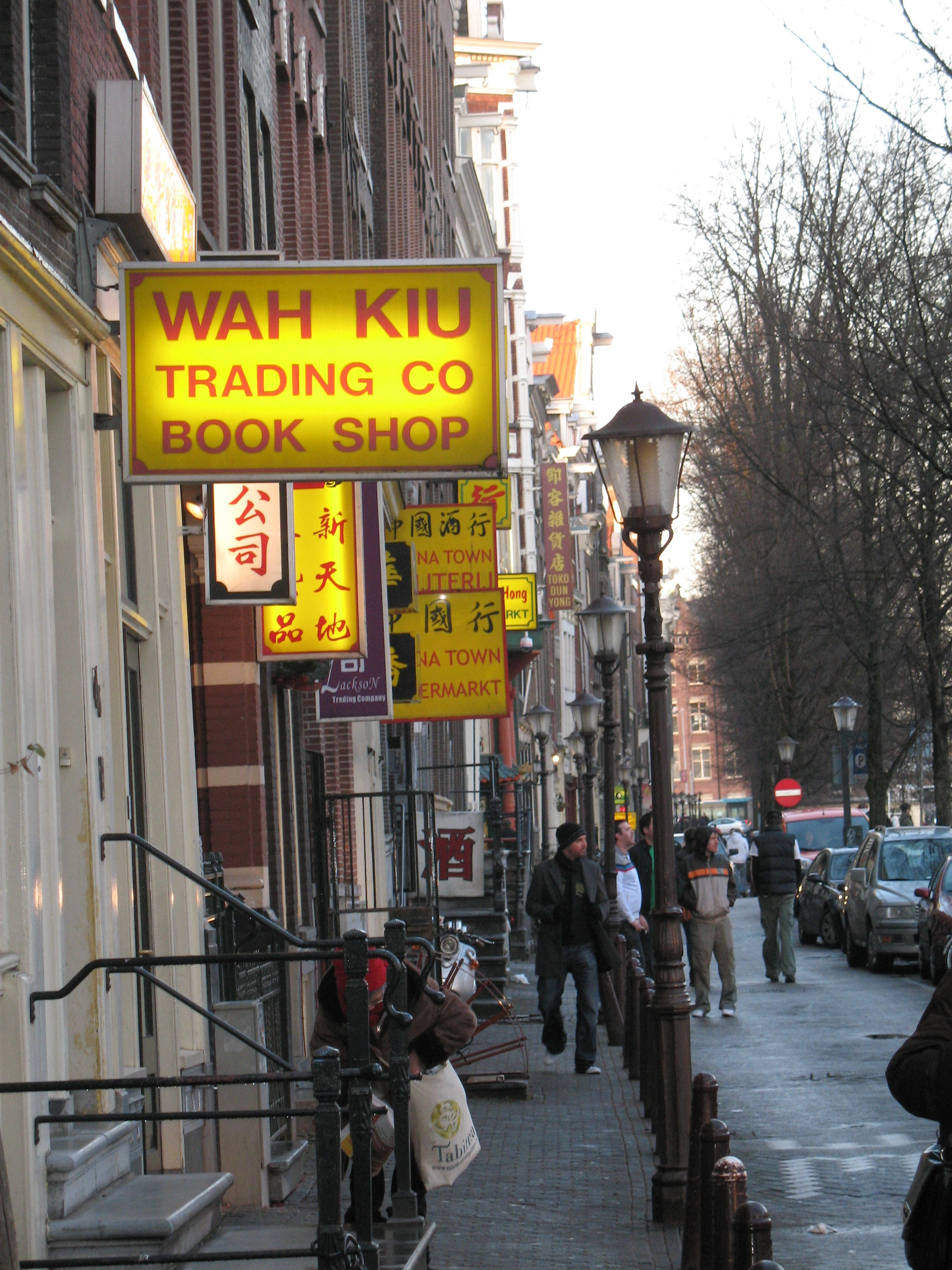
Chinese part of Geldersekade

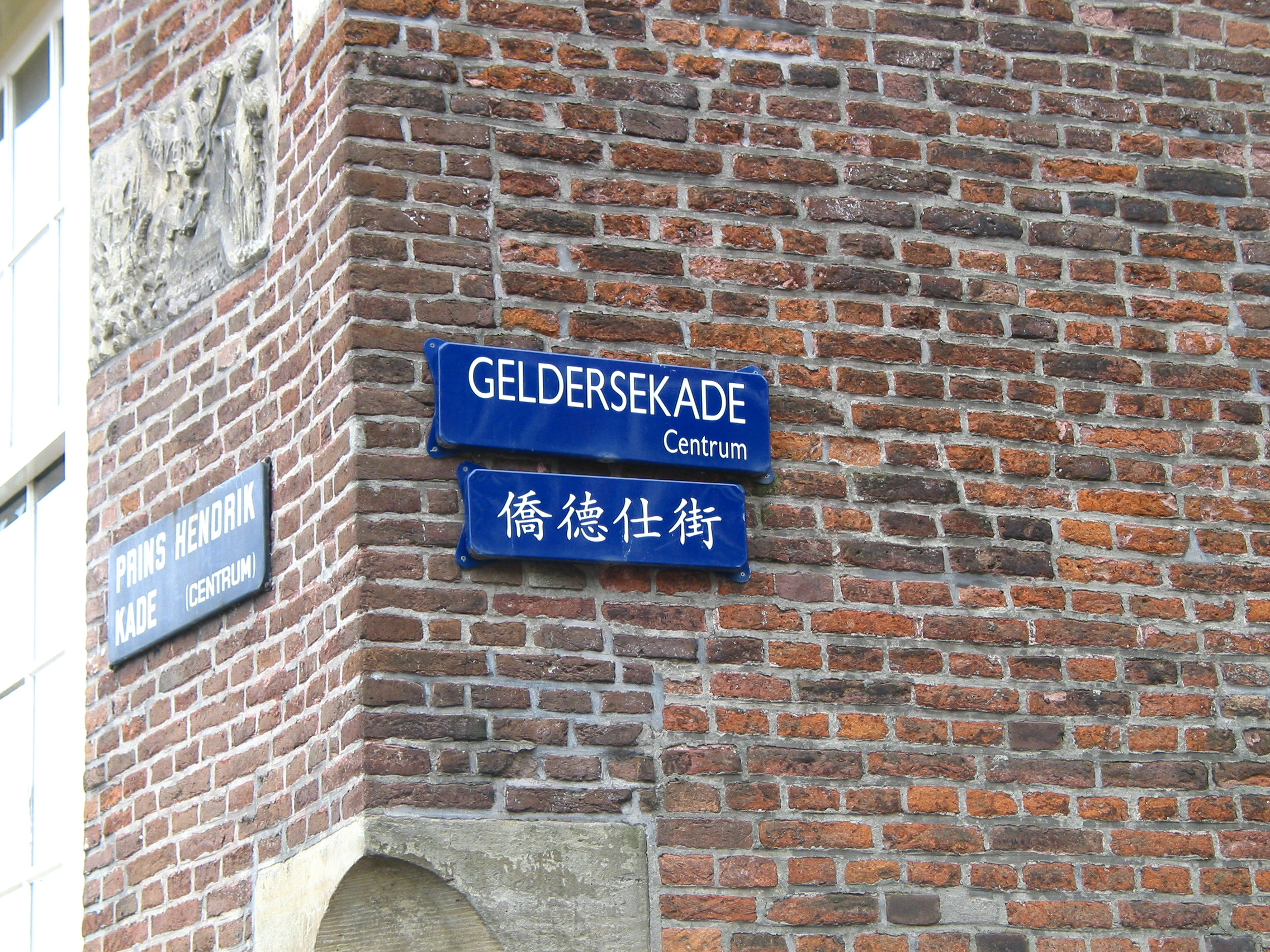
Dutch and Chinese street signs

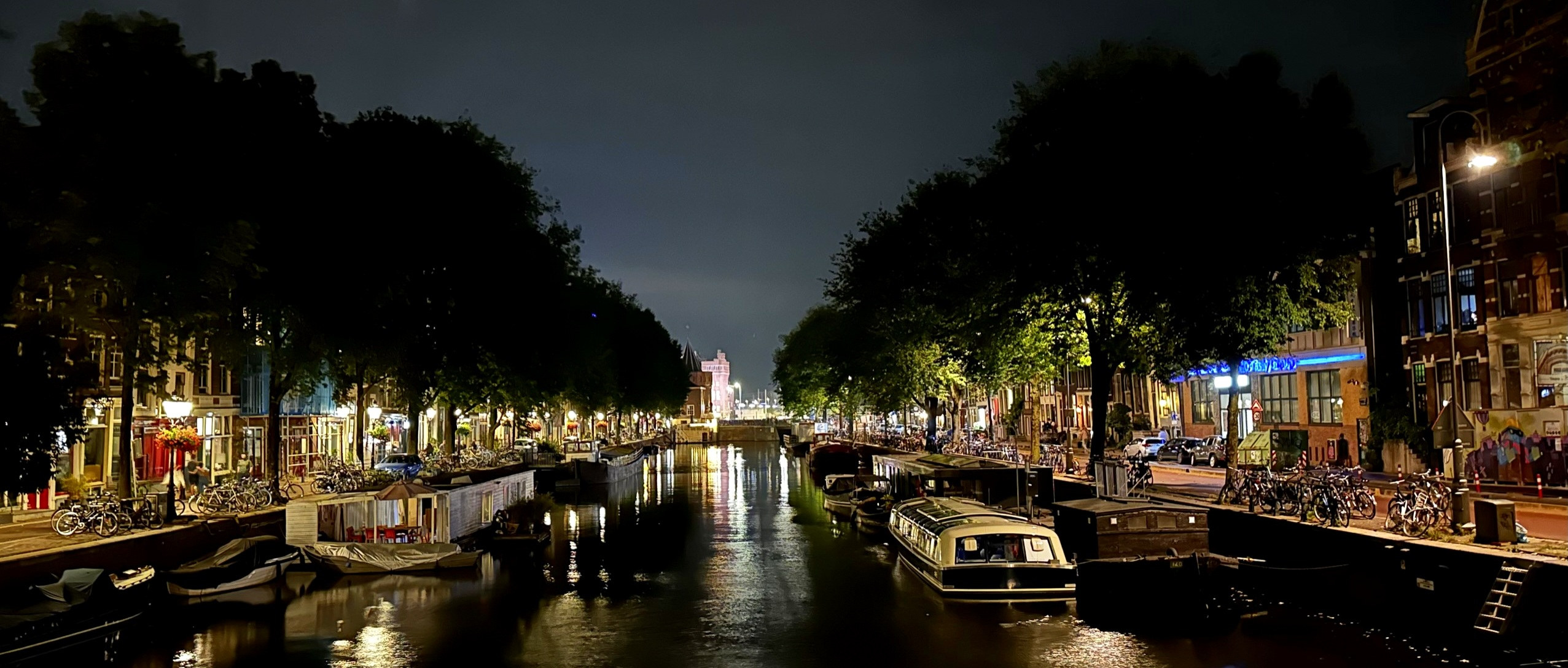
Geldersekade at night

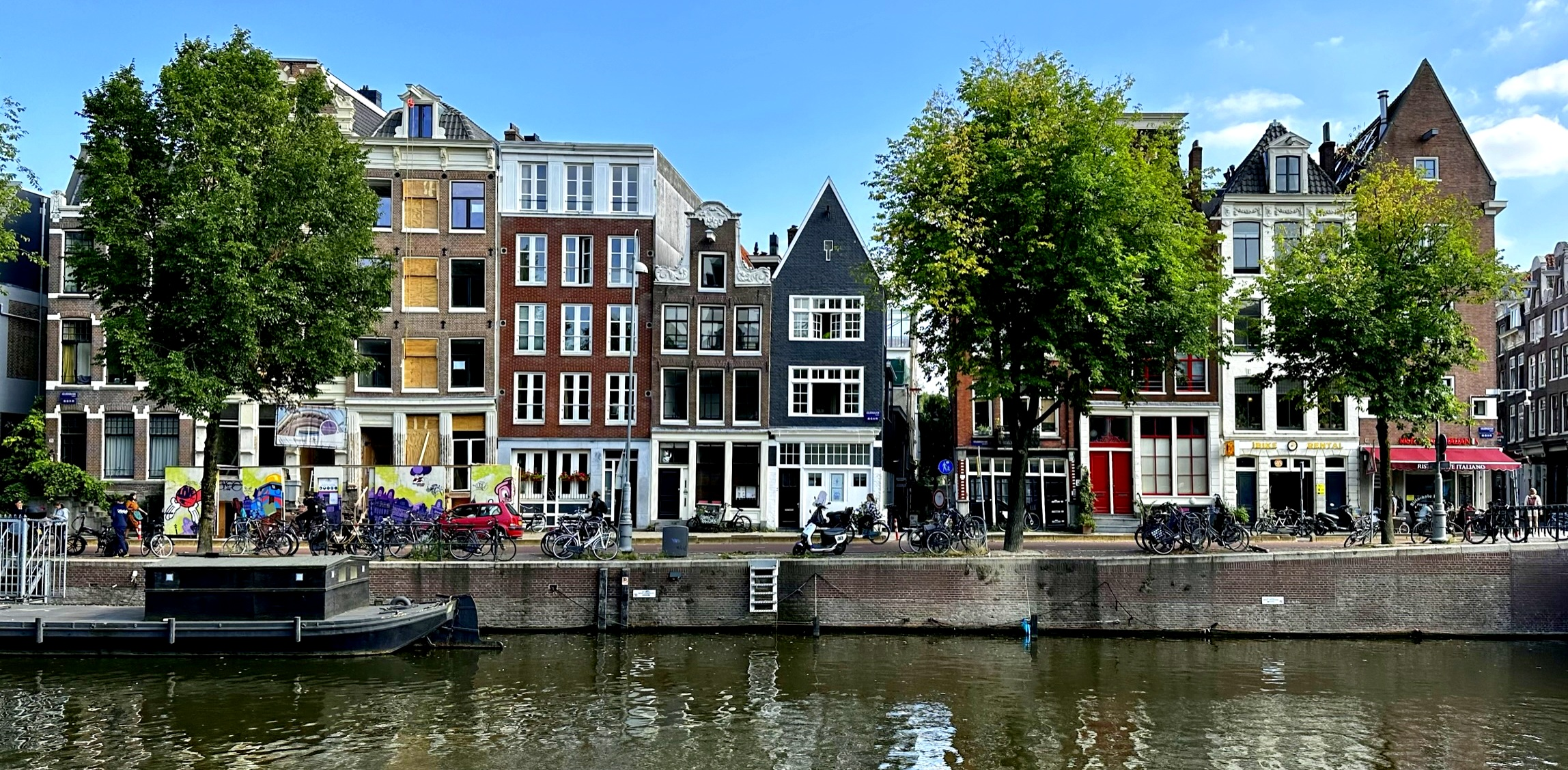
Buildings along Geldersekade

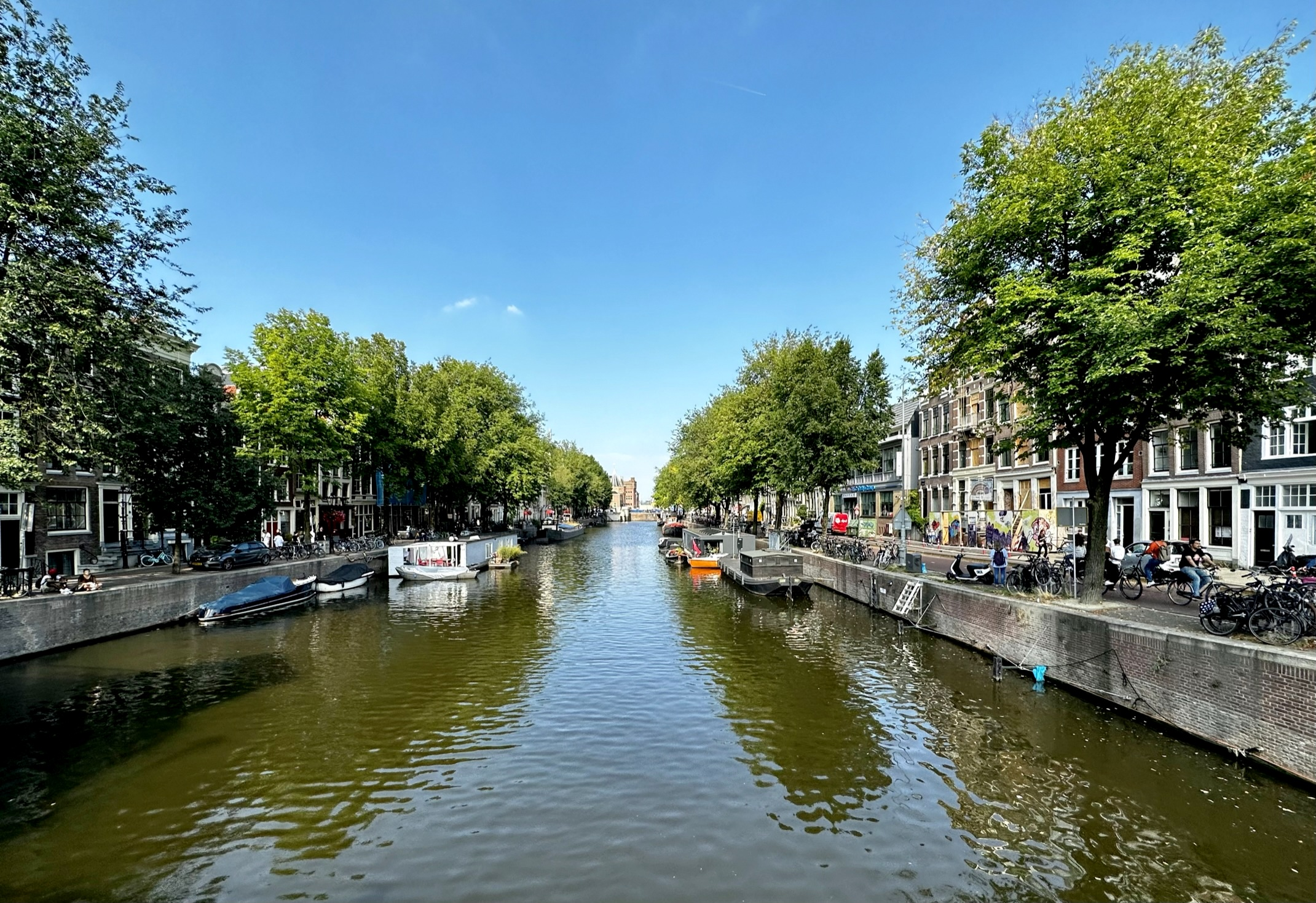
Geldersekade in 2023

== See also ==
- Canals of Amsterdam

== Sources ==
- Els van Wageningen, "Geldersekade tussen Waag en Schreierstoren", Stadsherstel Amsterdam, 2002
- Bureau Monumenten en Archeologie, Gelderse Kade 8, Tabaksvat.
- Buurtpagina - geldersekade.org
