= Cornelis Boom =

Dutch landowner and shipbuilder

Cornelis Pietersz. Boom

Personal details
- Died: 1579
- Occupation: Shipowner

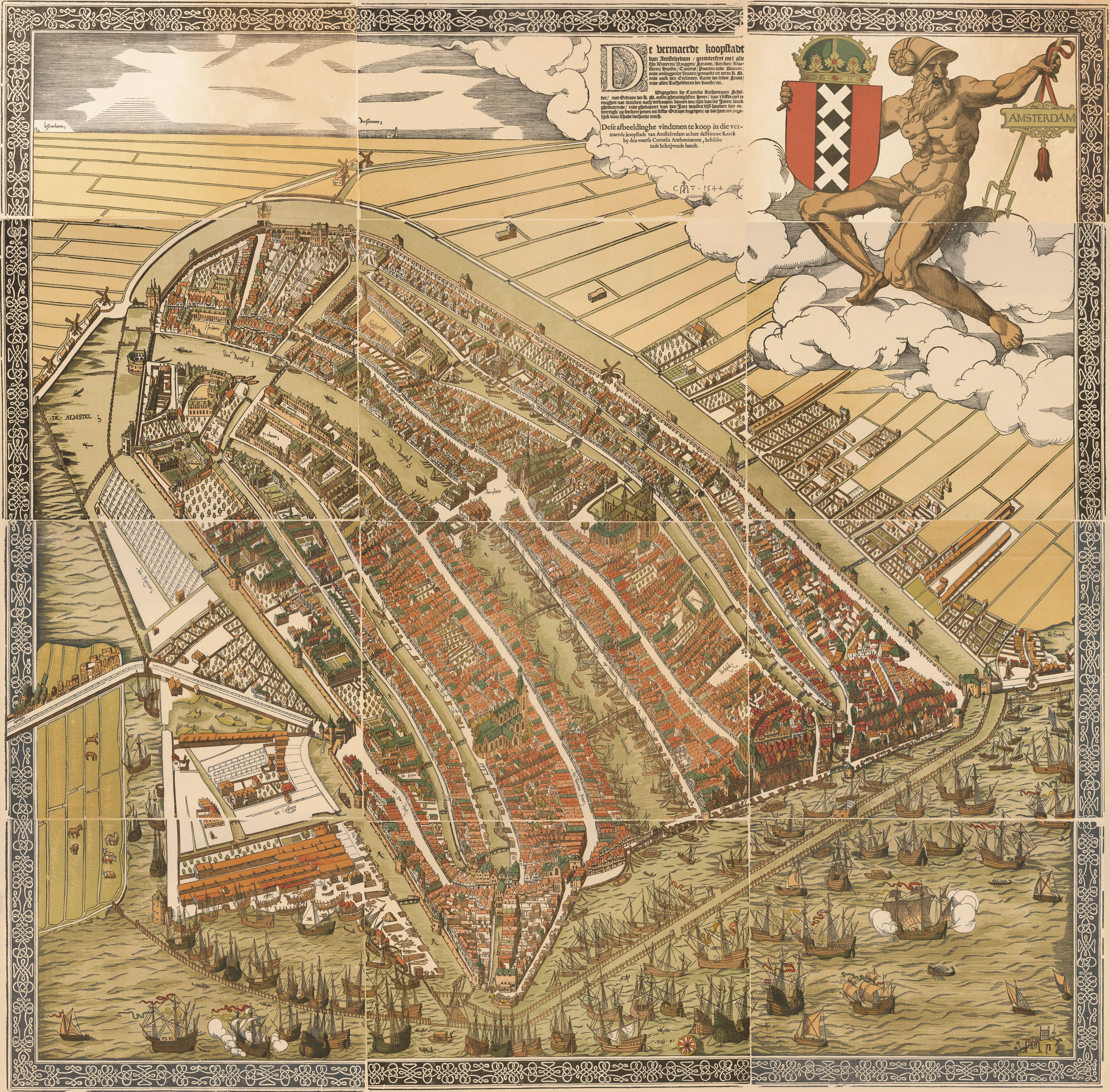
Amsterdam in a nutshell (1544) colored woodcut. The IJ (bottom, with ships) is to the north of the city. The Lastage is to the east (lower left) with rows of buildings along the waterfront. Boom's Rechtboomssloot runs behind these buildings, with the transverse Kromboomssloot running from it to the southwest.

Cornelis Pietersz. Boom (died 1579) was a Dutch landowner and shipbuilder who was involved in various disputes over opening up the Lastage area to the east of Amsterdam. His two sons and one grandson were mayors of Amsterdam.

== Life ==
Cornelis Pietersz. Boom was the owner of an orchard and one of the five lanes on the Lastage to the east of Amsterdam. Boom, who lived at what is now the Rechtboomssloot numbers 1 to 3, had two ditches, the Rechtboomssloot and Kromboomssloot, widened into canals around 1530 to connect his shipyard on the Lastage with the IJ. Both canals are named after Boom. The Kromboomssloot thereby became a cross-channel from the main Rechtboomssloot canal. As the names indicate, the Rechtboomssloot is completely straight while there is a bend in the Kromboomssloot. The Lastage was outside the city walls at the time and was therefore under threat of attacks from the county of Guelders. When Boom was given permission to dig the canals, he had to allow the Rechtboomssloot to be closed in the event of danger, without the city having to pay compensation to Boom for this.

In 1537 Boom was allowed to demolish the quay for a slipway and to build a bridge over his ditch, now the Rechtboomssloot. In 1538 there was an impending attack by Guelders. The permit was revoked and Boom was ordered to pull down the bridge and close the gap again. That caused a battle between the city government, which wanted to block the ditch, and the people of Lastage who wanted a free passage. Boom litigated as high as the Hof van Holland (High Court) in Brussels to keep his canal open. In 1565, on the advice of William the Silent, the Court ruled that the gates should remain open on at least one side during the day, so that free movement by water remained possible.

In 1542 the residents of the Lastage commissioned Cornelis Anthonisz. to draw a map of the city of Amsterdam, on which the area with its canals and buildings is clearly depicted. In 1543 it was rumored that Maarten van Rossum was approaching. The residents and owners on the Lastage asked Maria of Hungary for permission to enclose the Lastage. If necessary, they would pay the costs from their own pocket.

Boom had a house built that collapsed in 1545 due to the marshy subsoil. He asked for permission to start a shipyard on site where as many as five hundred people could find work.

1562 and 1564 were years of serious flooding, and the Rechtboomssloot was closed on one side. Boom felt he had been wronged. He and ten other Lastagians raised the matter with the Privy Council of the Habsburg Netherlands (Geheime Raad) in Mechelen, which referred the dispute to the Hof van Holland. The Lastagians then presented their case to William the Silent, who advised the Land Guardians (voogd) to decide in favor of the Lastagians. Governess Margaret of Parma decided on 6 August 1565 that the Rechtboomssloot should be opened to the Lastagians during the day. They could not derive any rights from the decision.

In 1567 the Duke of Alba arrived and took charge. In 1576 he may have returned after the Pacification of Ghent.

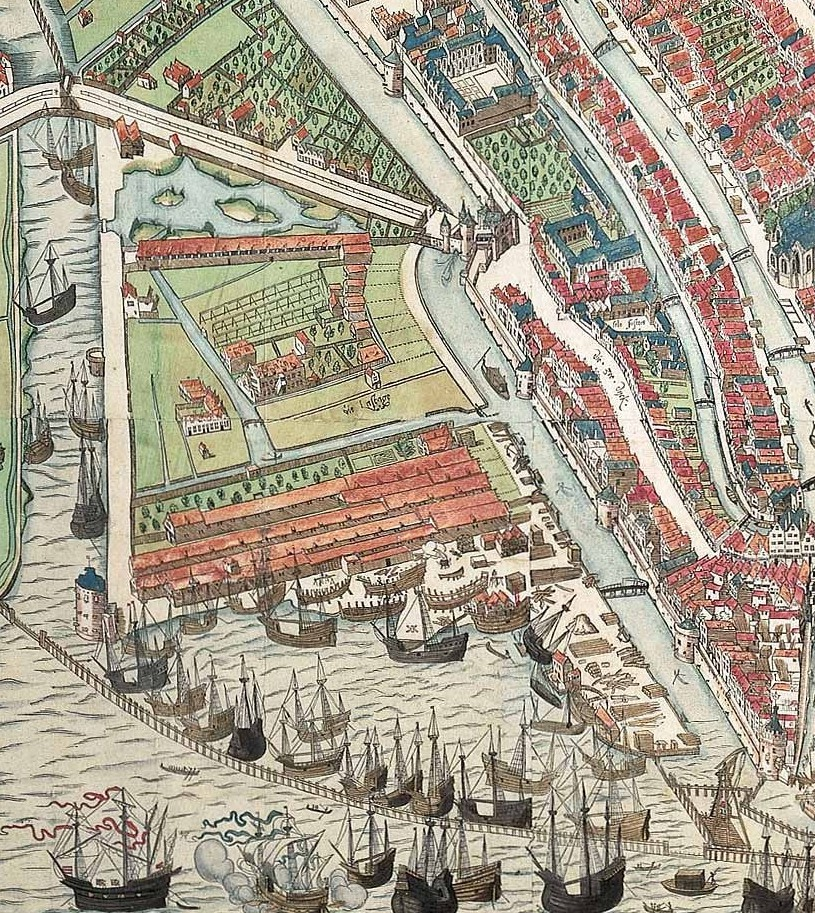
Detail of a woodcut from 1544 by Cornelis Anthonisz. showing the Lastage area

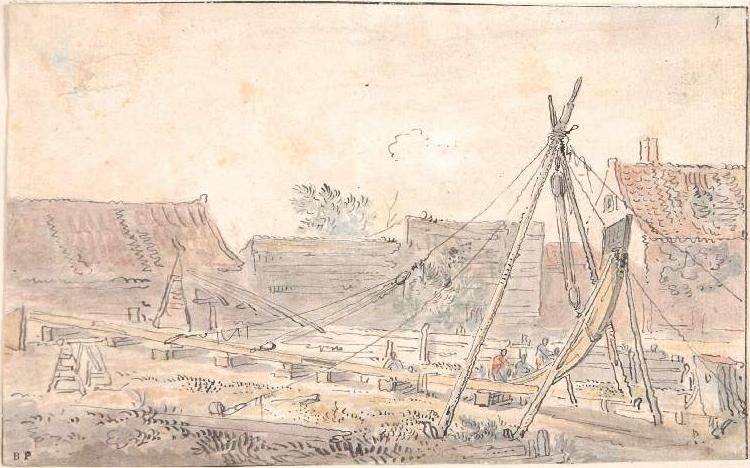
Ship launching slip by Hendrick Avercamp

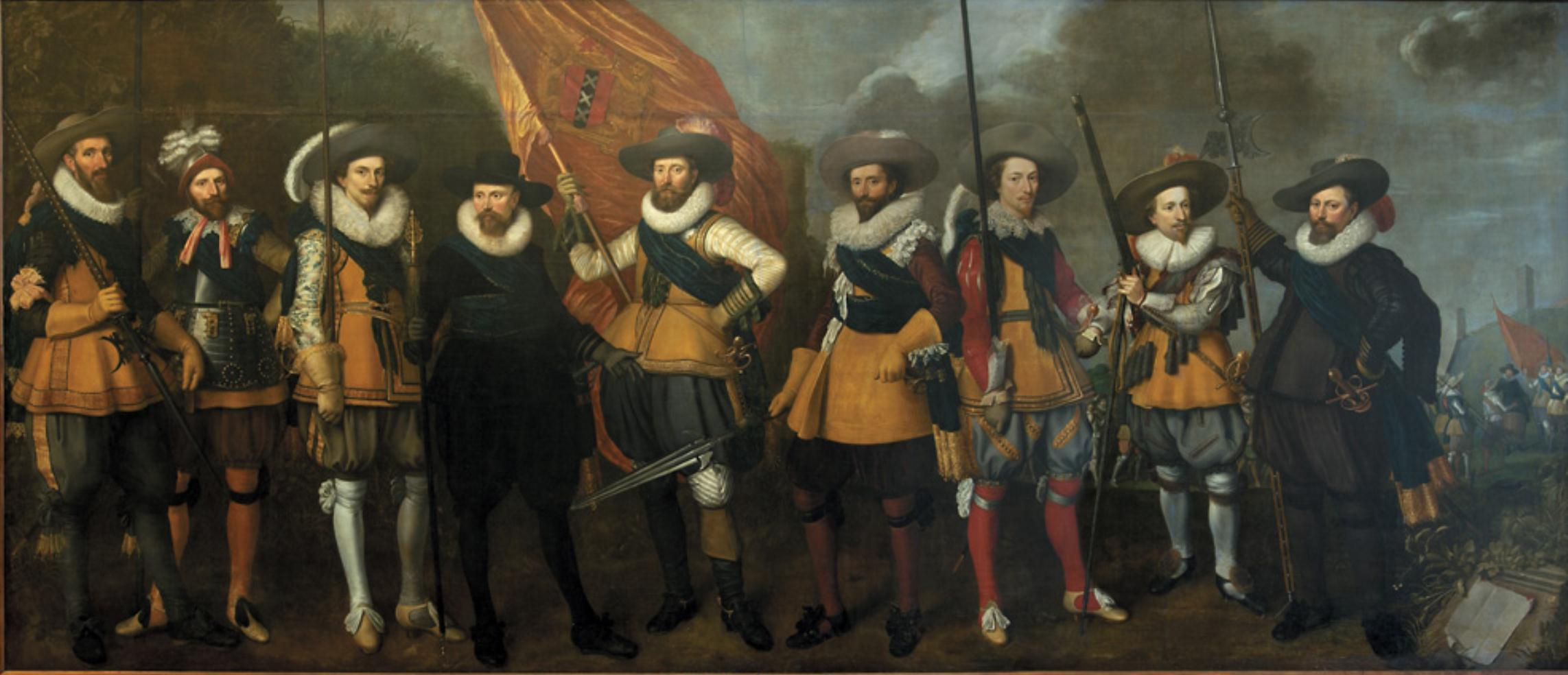
Militia of Captain Abraham Boom and Lieutenant Oetgens van Waveren (1623)

== Descendants ==
Boom's son Pieter Cornelisz. Boom was a councilor in 1580 and in 1582, and was mayor sixteen times from 1583 to 1608. In 1607 he was involved in the reclamation of Beemster, together with Dirck van Os and Jacob Poppen.

Abraham Boom (1575 – 26 June 1642) married in 1599, was a member of the vro Gereedschap in 1609 and captain of the Schutterij (militia) in 1616. He is depicted in a painting of militiamen by Pieter Lastman. He was mayor from 1625 to 1639. In 1638 he and Albert Burgh, Antonie Oetgens van Waveren and Pieter Hasselaer received Marie de' Medici.

Boom's grandson Cornelis Abrahamsz. Boom (1601 – 22 August 1651) was a member of the Amsterdam council in the year of his death and at the same time was elected mayor, which was very unusual: a mayor was usually chosen from the sitting councilors. He was the last male descendant of Boom.
