= Snoekjesgracht =

Canal in Amsterdam

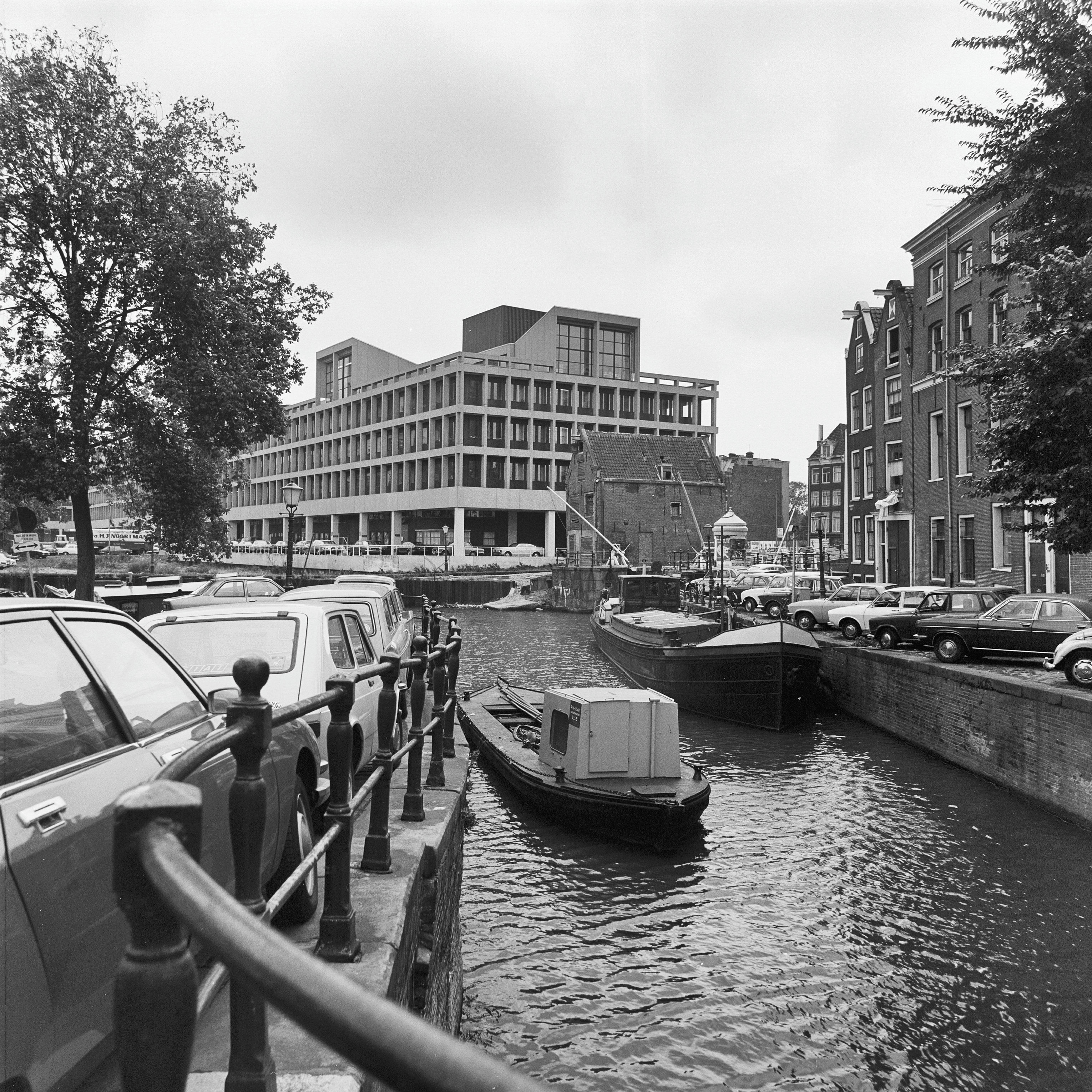
- Snoekjesgracht in February 1976 from Snoekjesbrug (Bridge 289) south to Sint Antoniesluis, Maupoleum in the background (demolished 1994).

- Location within Amsterdam
- Location: Amsterdam
- Postal code: 1011
- Coordinates: 52.370438°N 4.901358°E
- North end: Kromboomssloot
- To: Sint Antoniesluis / Oudeschans

The Snoekjesgracht (Pike Canal) is a small canal in Amsterdam, in the Lastage neighborhood.

== Location ==
The canal runs behind Sint Antoniesbreestraat from the Sint Antoniesluis (at the southern end of the Oudeschans) in a more or less northerly direction to a bend, where the canal turns to the east and becomes the Kromboomssloot. At this bend there is a square with benches and a pillar-shaped artwork by Wim Tap from 1989. The Snoekjessteeg, as an extension of the through route in an easterly direction from Dam Square, runs from Sint Antoniesbreestraat (where there is an exit from Nieuwmarkt metro station) to Snoekjesgracht. The Snoekjesbrug (bridge no. 289) crosses the Snoekjesgracht at the Snoekjessteeg.

== History ==
The Snoekjesgracht, originally called Snoeksgracht, was named after a 16th-century resident, Jan Pieters Snoeck, who had a house built on this canal in 1595 and depicted a pike (fish) on the facade.

The Snoekjesgracht is located in the old Jodenbuurt (Jewish quarter) of Amsterdam. During the German occupation in World War II many Jewish residents were deported to Nazi concentration camps where they died.

After the war, many of the buildings on the east side were demolished and replaced by new buildings in the 1980s .

In the past the Snoekjesgracht extended further north, between Sint Antoniesbreestraat and Dijkstraat, but in 1867 this part (called the Rotterdammersloot) was filled in. In 2003, the Amsterdam-Centrum district investigated whether the filled-in Rotterdammersloot was suitable for being dug out again, but abandoned this because of the existing buildings and lack of space.

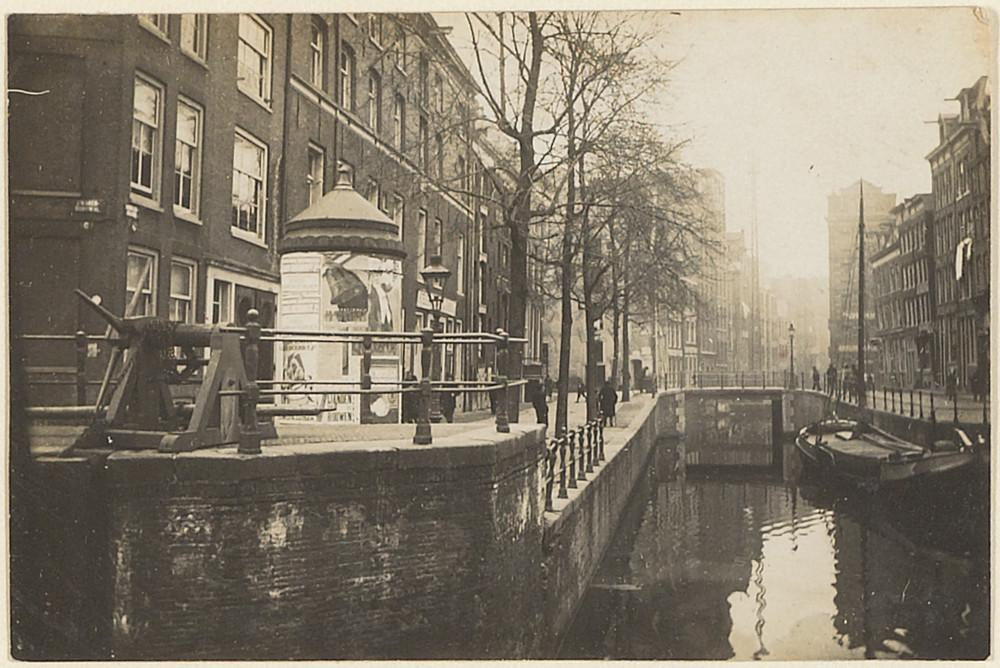
Snoekjesgracht looking north to the Snoekjesbrug (Bridge 289) (1930)

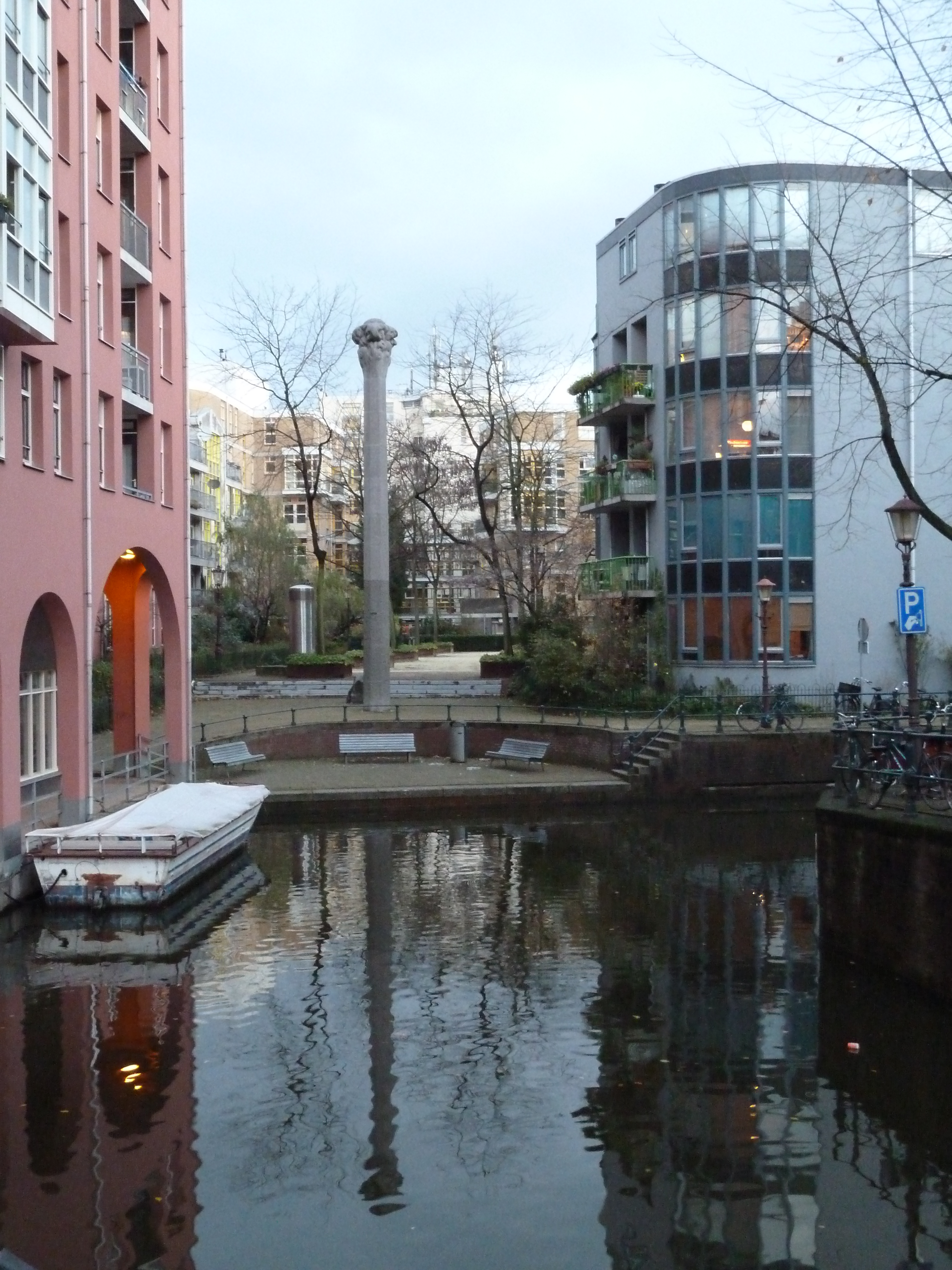
Snoekjesgracht looking to the north, with buildings from the 1980s and the pillar-shaped artwork by Wim Tap.

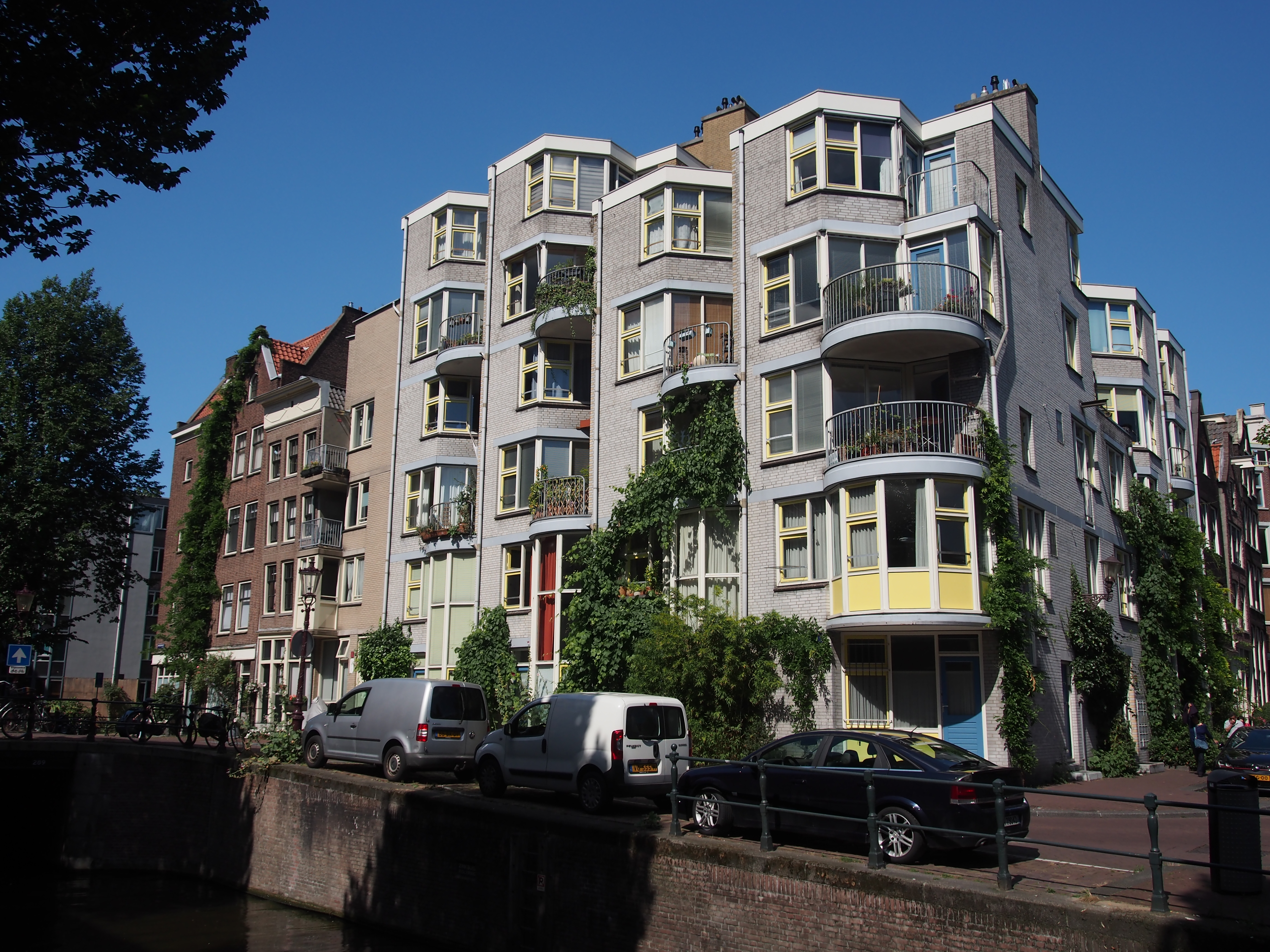
Snoekjesgracht 2016

== See also ==
- Canals of Amsterdam
