= Markengracht =

Canal in Amsterdam

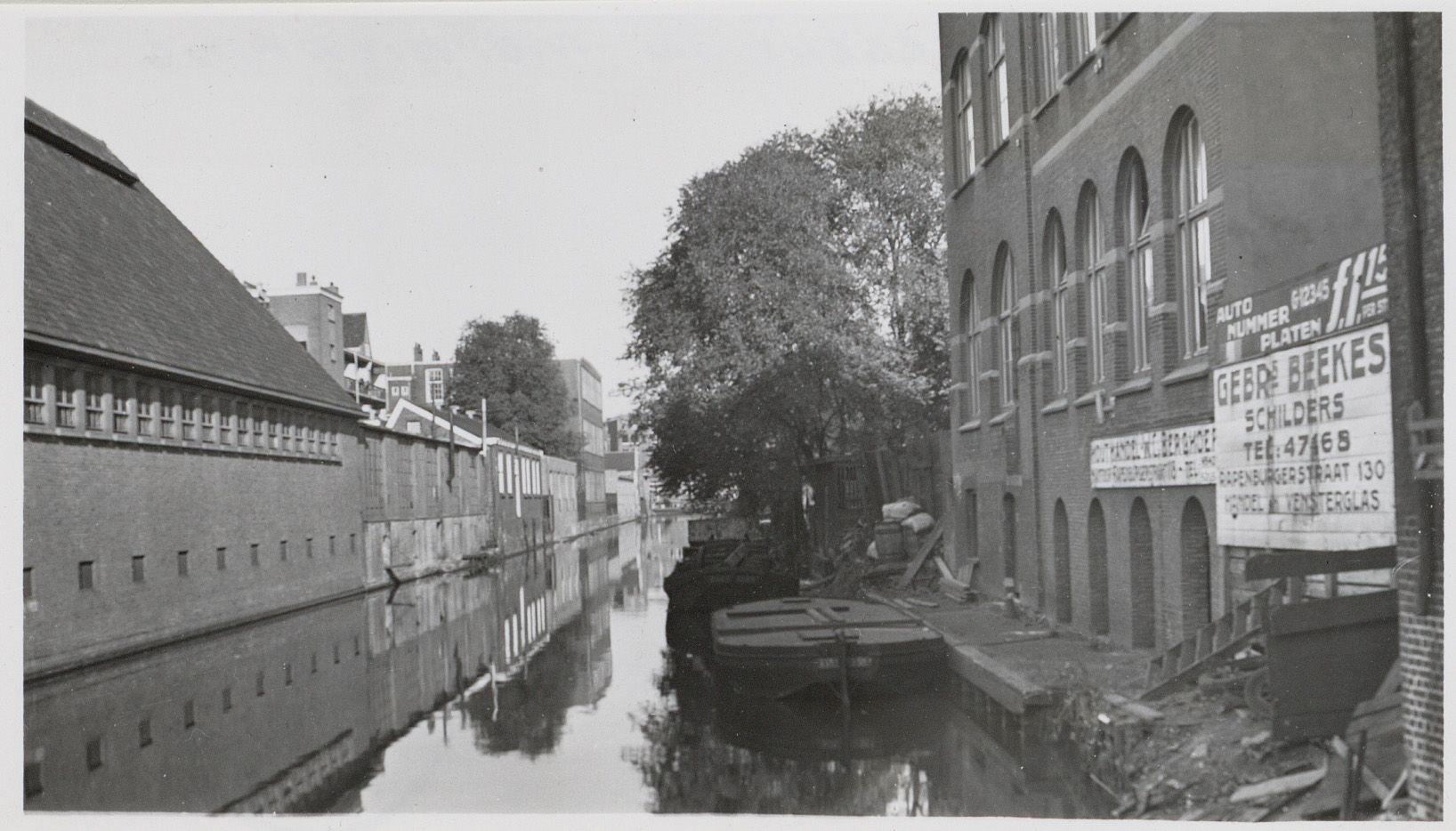
- Markengracht seen towards Rapenburgwal; Jacobus van Vervaardiger Eck (1936)

- Location within Amsterdam
- Location: Amsterdam
- Postal code: 1016
- Coordinates: 52.369411°N 4.907569°E

The Markengracht was a canal in Amsterdam. For many years it was at the heart of the slums of the poor Jewish neighborhood. It was filled in 1968 as part of a complete rehabilitation of the area combined with construction of the IJtunnel, opened on 30 October 1968. It is now the site of a complex of new residential buildings.

== Location ==
The Markengracht was in the center of the poor part of the Jewish quarter. It ran between the Rapenburgwal and Houtkopersburgwal canals, which both used to extend southeast to the Markengracht. The Vinkenbuurt was on the southeast side of the canal, between the canal and Rapenburgerstraat. Valkenburgerstraat and the buildings of Marken were on the northwest side.

== History ==
The Marken or Valkenburg island was created in the IJ around 1593. Due to a surveying error it was much narrower than the adjoining Uilenburg island, and had just one main street running through it, Valkenburgerstraat. Maps from the 16th to 18th century show ship ramps along the Markengracht, the eastern boundary of the island, but the shipyards later relocated because the canal was too narrow.

The journalist and writer Meijer Sluyser (1901–73) who grew up beside the canal described it as "the murderer" because it was so filthy. He wrote, "Carrots of human feces float in the canal. Rats the size of cats that win prizes at exhibition frolic in broad daylight in the yards." Rapenburgerstraat had houses, factories such as the Verduin ladies' hat factory, and institutions such as a girl's orphanage backing onto the canal. The Markengracht School was a public primary education school, located at Markengracht 3 from 1874 to 1933. The synagogue of the chewre Tif'eres Jisroeil was housed on the lower floor of Markengracht 5 from 1835 until 1928, when many of its members moved to the Transvaal neighborhood.

Efforts by the city to clean up the slums were started in 1926. After World War II (1939–45) the municipality decided to completely renovate the old Jewish quarter. Residents were moved and the buildings demolished. The canal was filled in 1968. The whole area between Valkenburgerstraat and Rapenburgerstraat was cleared for construction of the IJtunnel, leaving a wide empty space between the two streets. In the 1980s the council heard from local residents who wanted the land to be used for residences and small businesses, and after many delays a complex of new buildings was opened in 1999. The three new buildings, each with a central courtyard with water and plants, are separated by two semi-public plazas.

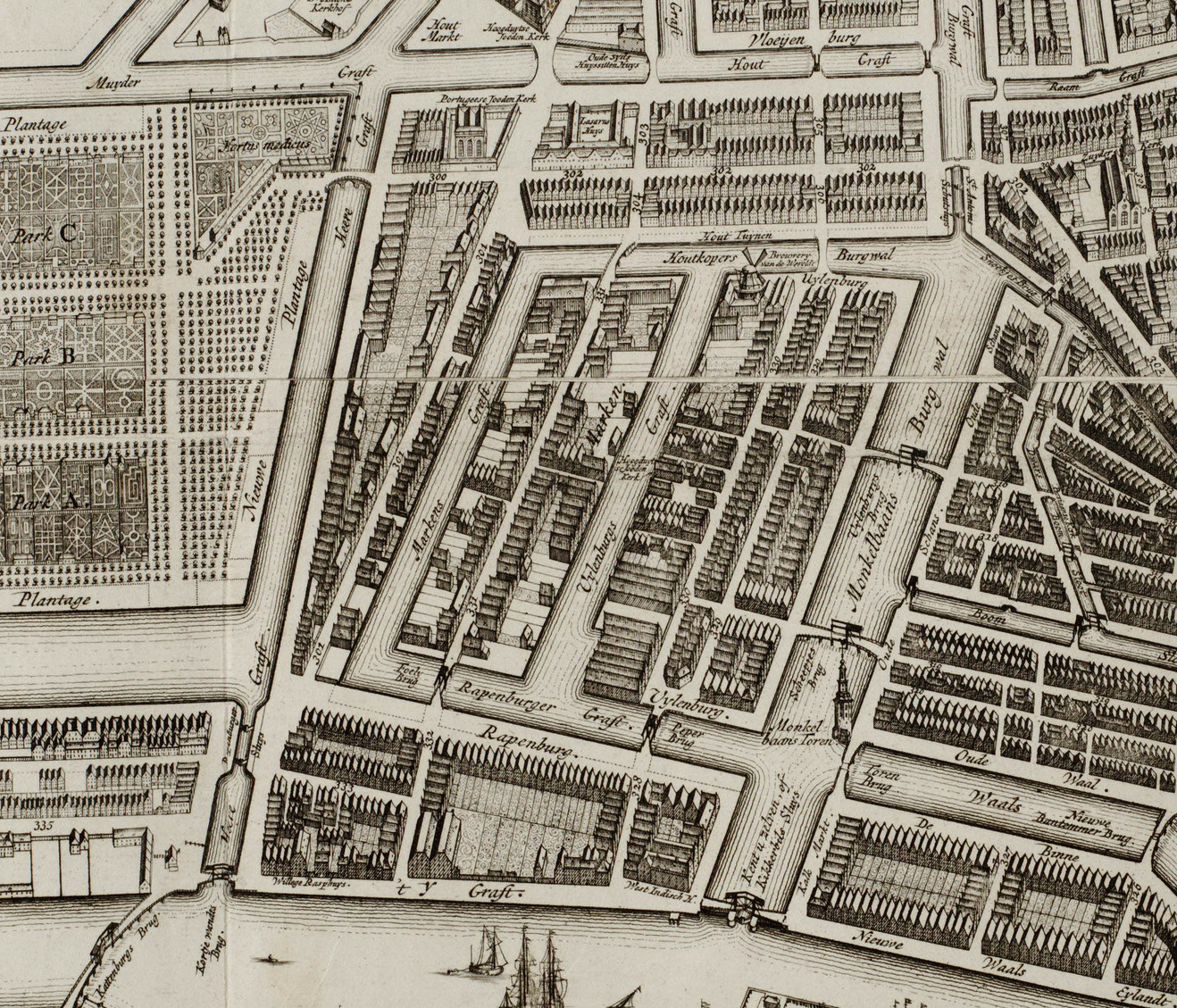
Detail of 1737 map, looking south. In the center a square of canals with Uilenburgergracht running across it. Clockwise from left, Markengracht (SE), Houtkopersburgwal (SW), Monkelbaansburgwal (Oudeschans) (NW), Rapenburgwal (NE).

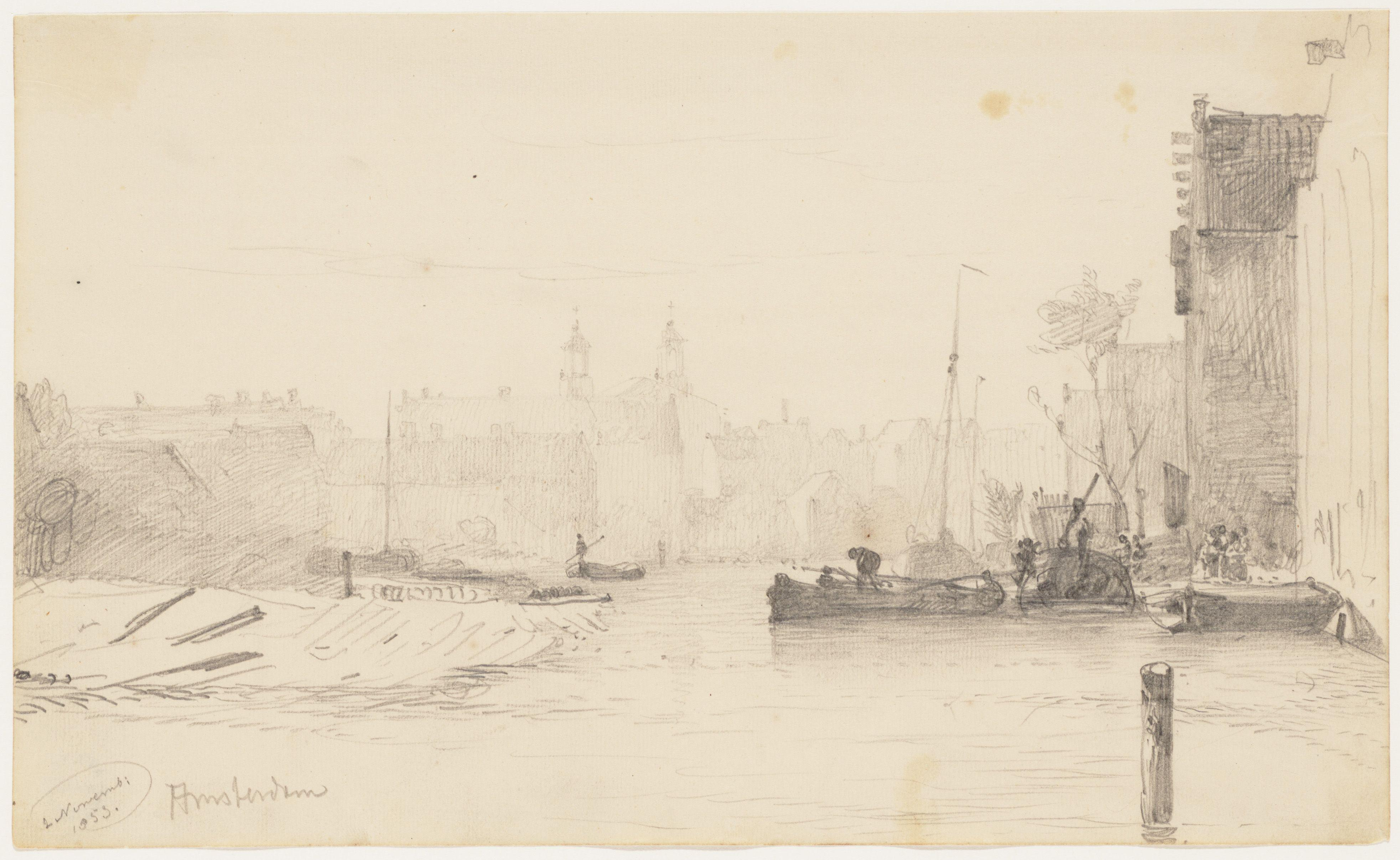
Markengracht seen to the south. W.A. van Deventer, 1853

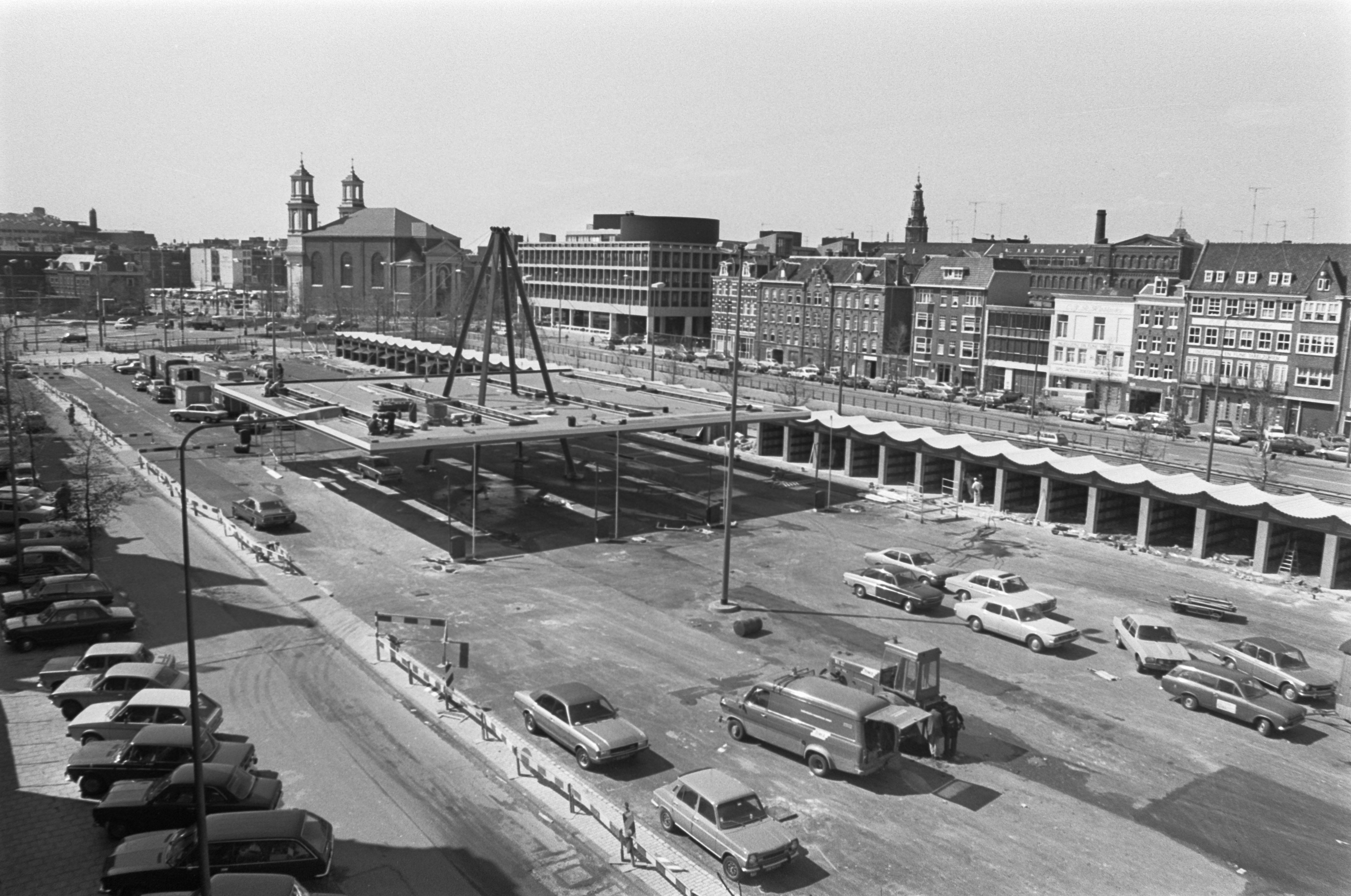
Rapenburgerstraat (1977), temporary home of the Waterloopleinmarkt from 1977 to 1988.

== Sources ==
- "Buurt S", velehanden.nl/ (in Dutch)
- Cees Boekraad (2001), "VaRa-strook/VaRa strip Amsterdam 1990-1999", Atelier Pro, Rotterdam, ISBN 9789064504327
- Evert Werkman (1982), Juffer Hep Je Een Emmertje Poep (in Dutch)
- Guus Luijters (12 February 2018), "Sporen van levens", onsamsterdam (in Dutch)
- "Markengracht", Joodsamsterdam, 2 March 2017
- "Valkenburgerstraat 68", Amsterdam Cultuur Historische Vereniging
