= Rapenburgwal =

Canal in Amsterdam

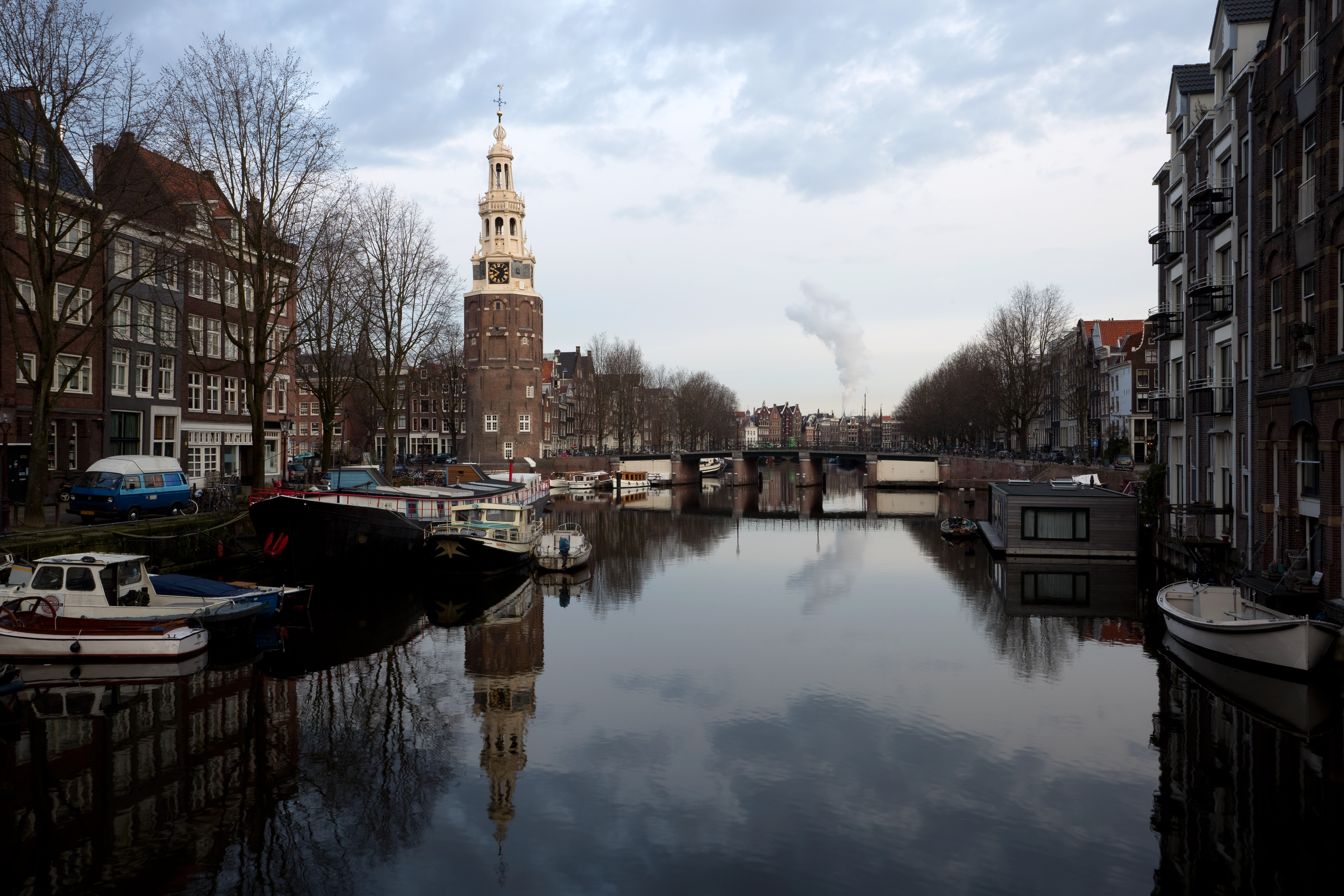
- Rapenburgwal looking towards the Montelbaanstoren

- Location within Amsterdam
- Location: Amsterdam
- Postal code: 1011
- Coordinates: 52.371520°N 4.907275°E
- Southeast end: Uilenburgergracht
- To: Oudeschans

The Rapenburgwal (Dutch pronunciation: [ˈraːpə(m)ˌbʏr(ə)xʋɑl]) is a canal in Amsterdam in the east of the Amsterdam-Centrum district, in the Lastage neighborhood.

== Location ==
The canal forms the northeast border of the island of Uilenburg. It is connected to Oudeschans and Uilenburgergracht, which delimit the northwest and the southeast of the island. It is crossed in its center section by Bridge 281, Peperbrug, which connects Nieuwe Uilenburgerstraat on Uilenburg island to Peperstraat on Marken (Valkenburg) island.

A 1737 map shows that the canal once ran further east to the Markengracht, which was back-filled in 1968 during construction of the IJtunnel.

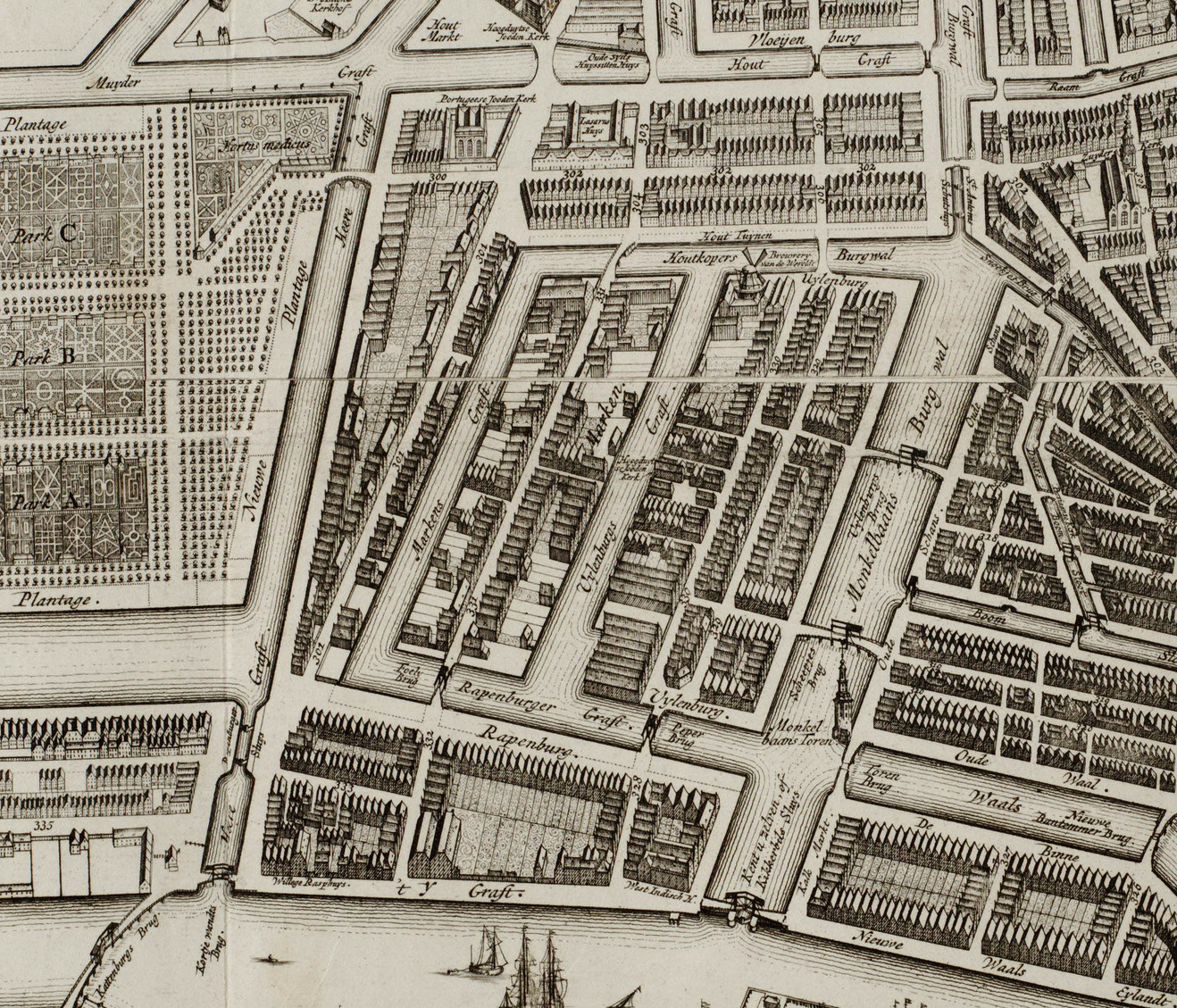
Detail of 1737 map, looking south. In the center a square of canals with Uilenburgergracht running across it. Clockwise from left, Markengracht (SE), Houtkopersburgwal (SW), Monkelbaansburgwal (Oudeschans) (NW), Rapenburgwal (NE).

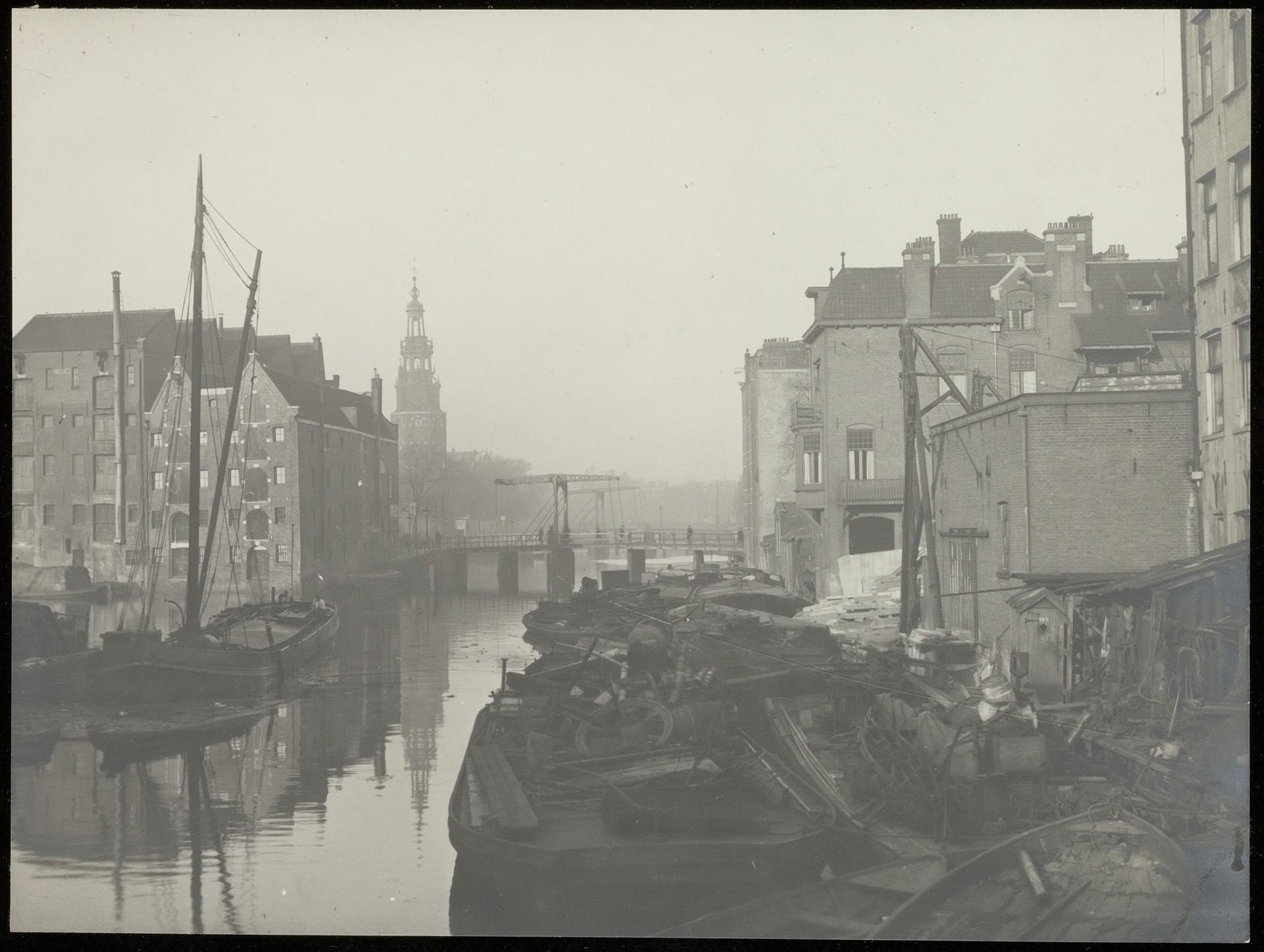
The Rapenburgwal towards Oudeschans with the Montelbaan tower. Foreground Peperbrug (bridge 281). (1900)

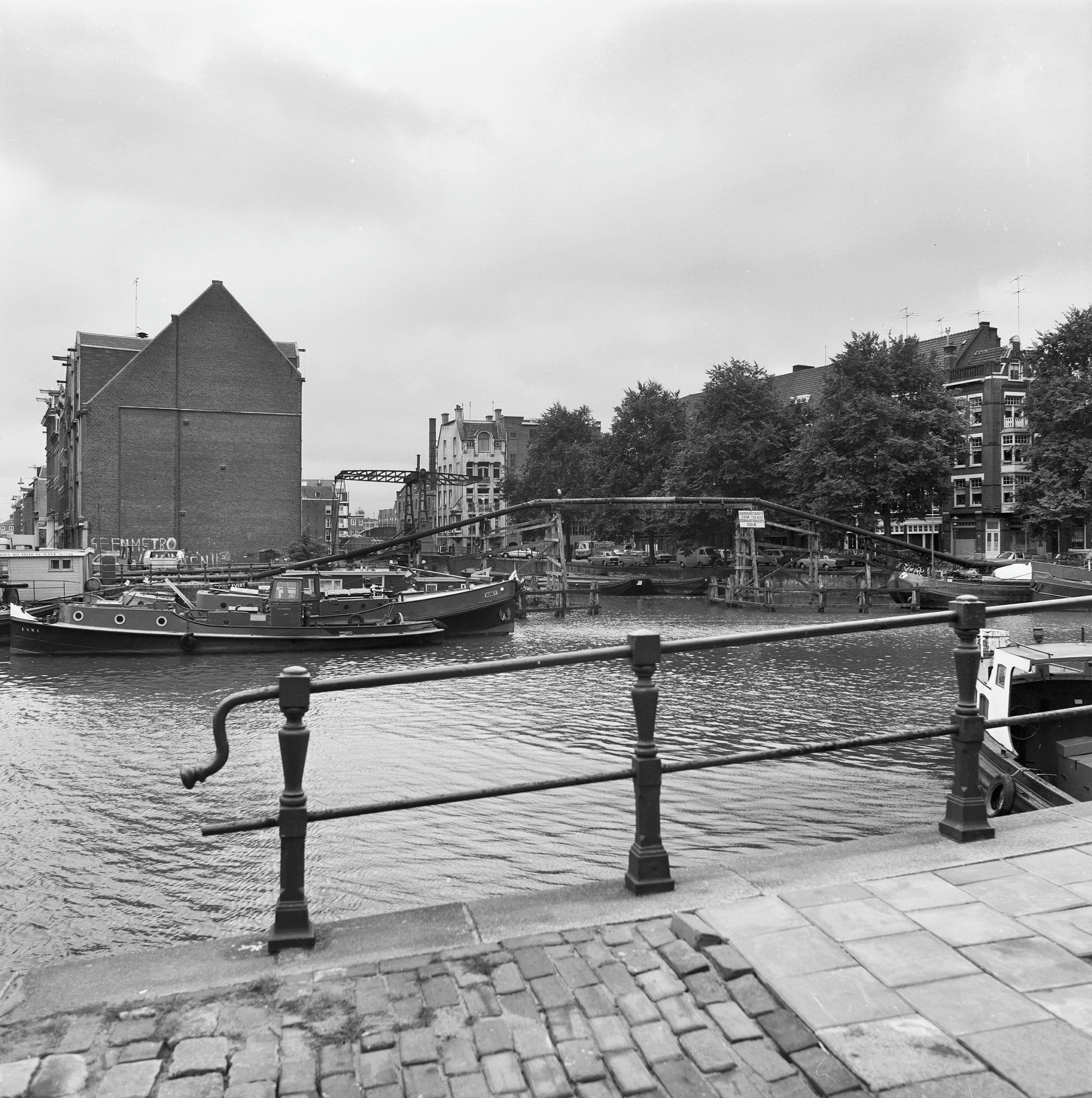
Rapenburgwal from the bridge at the Montelbaanstoren

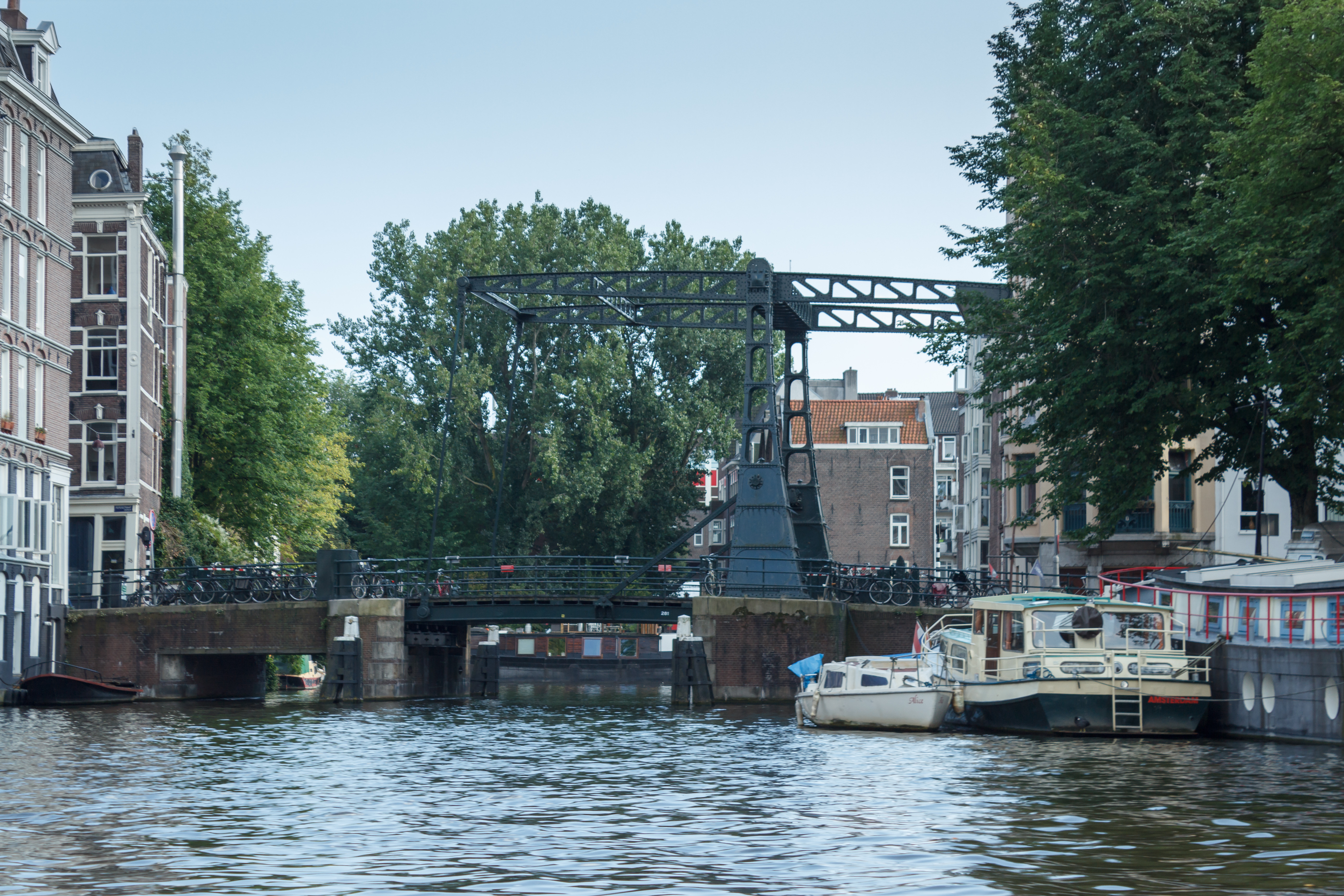
Peperbrug from Rapenwal (2016)

== See also ==
- Canals of Amsterdam
