= Houtkopersburgwal =

Canal in Amsterdam

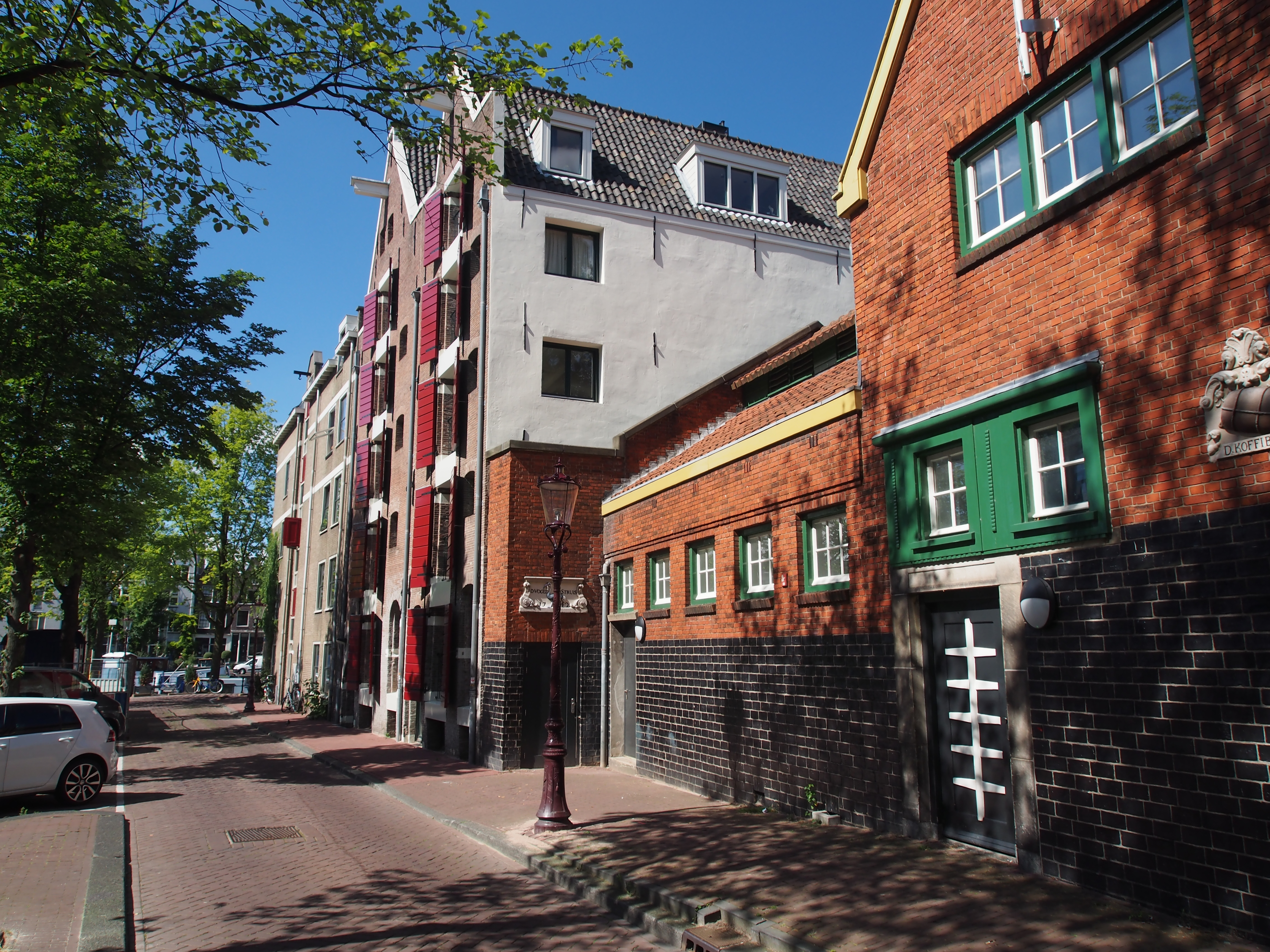
- Houtkopersburgwal

- Location within Amsterdam
- Location: Amsterdam
- Postal code: 1011
- Coordinates: 52.369685°N 4.902754°E
- Northwest end: Oudeschans
- To: Uilenburgergracht

The Houtkopersburgwal is a short secondary canal in Amsterdam. It is located in the east of the Amsterdam-Centrum district in the Lastage neighborhood.

== Location ==
The Houtkopersburgwal connects the Oudeschans to the Uilenburgergracht around the island of Uilenburg. It constitutes the southwest limit of this island. Its route is parallel to that of Rapenburgwal, which defines the northeast border of the island. The canal is crossed by the Nieuwe Uilenburgerstraat via Bridge 291, Steenvoetsluis, in the center of its length.

The canal was dug following construction of the Uilenburgergracht in 1593 in order to link it to the Oudeschans. A 1737 map shows that the canal once ran further east to the Markengracht. This was back-filled in 1968 during construction of the IJtunnel. In the nineteenth century, the newly created islands of Uilenburg and Valkenburg (aka Marken) were the poorest neighborhoods of the Jodenbuurt (Jewish quarter).

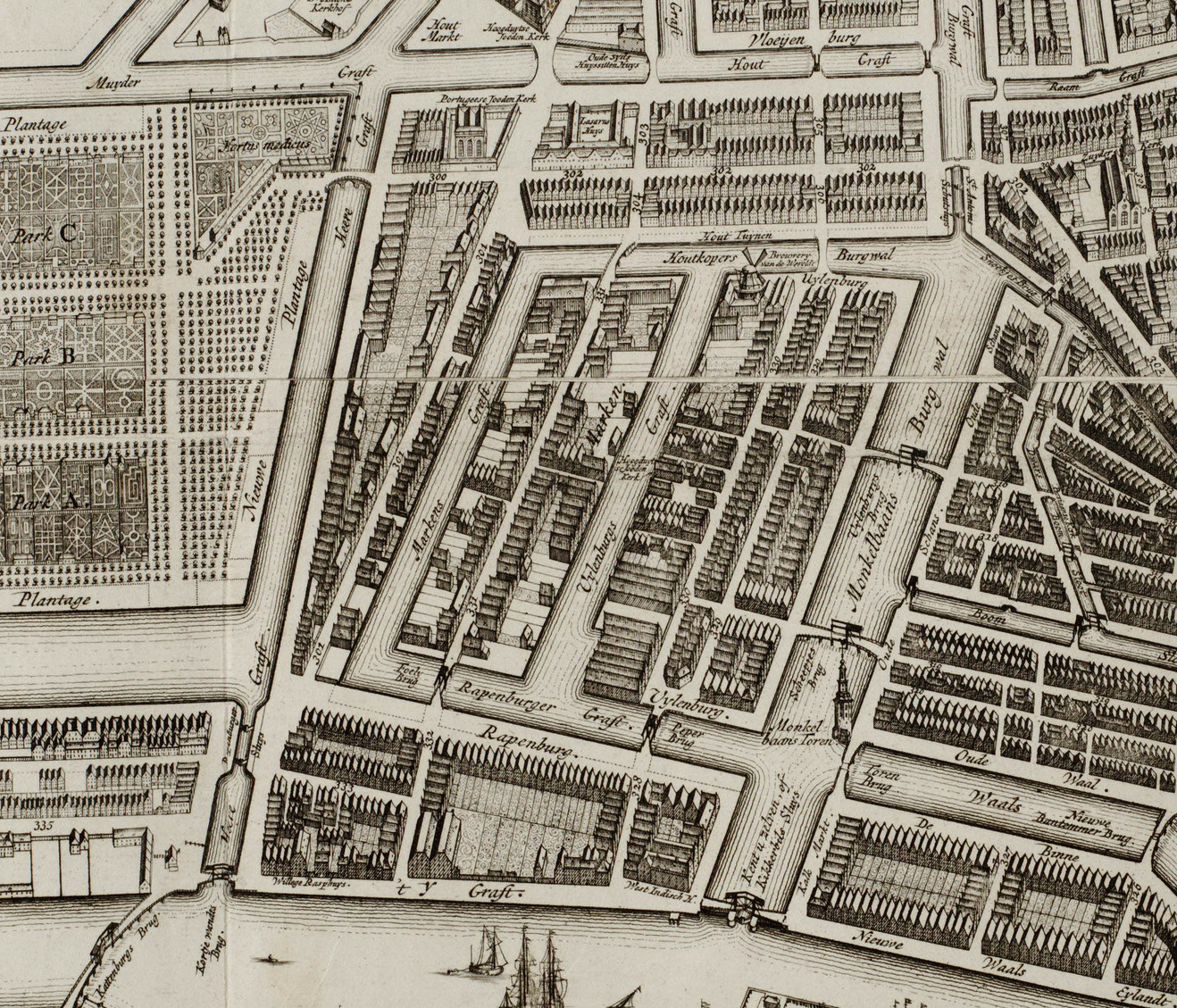
Detail of 1737 map, looking south. In the center a square of canals with Uilenburgergracht running across it. Clockwise from left, Markengracht (SE), Houtkopersburgwal (SW), Monkelbaansburgwal (Oudeschans) (NW), Rapenburgwal (NE).

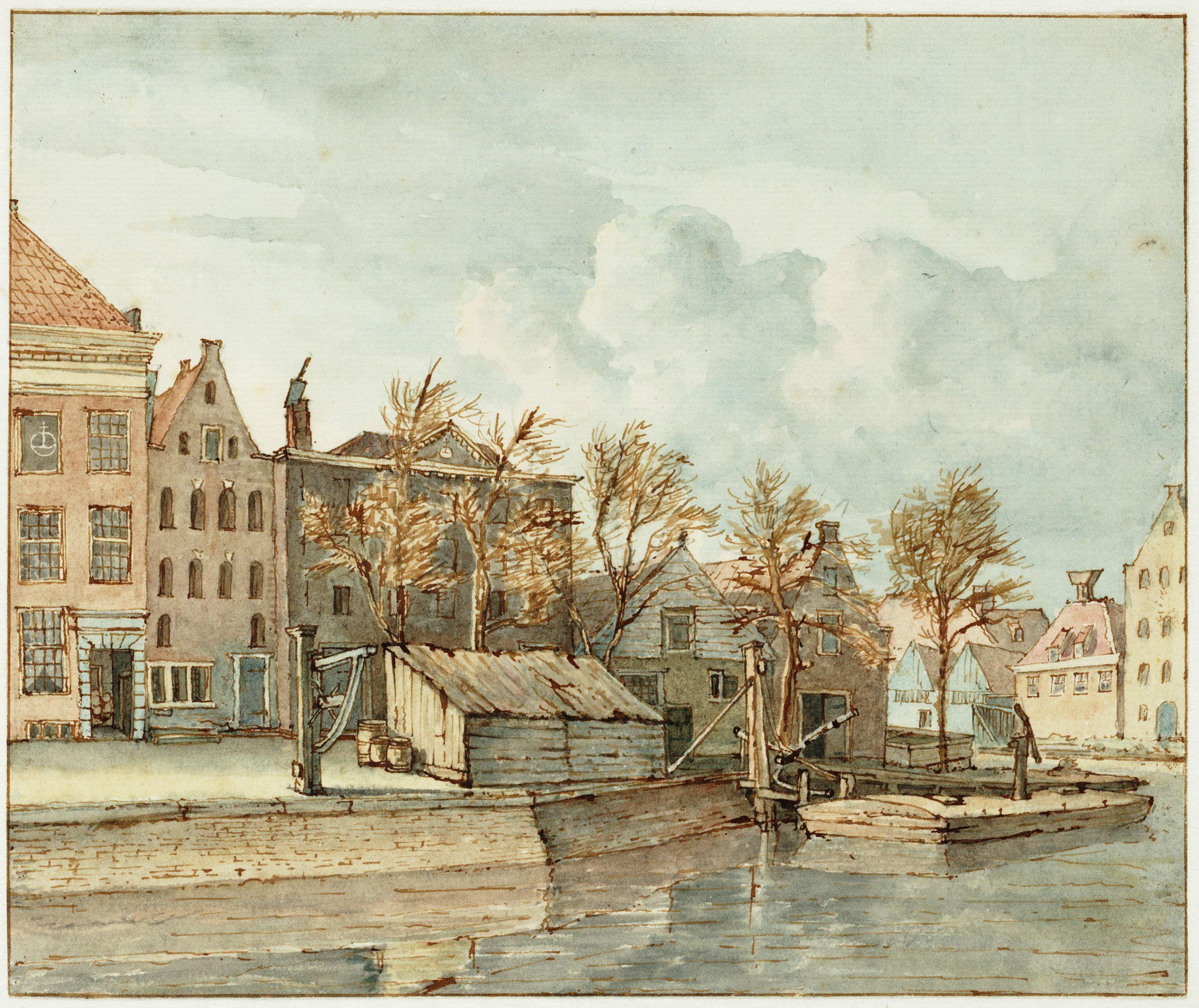
Houtkopersburgwal with De Wereld brewery on the island of Uilenburg. Gerrit Lamberts, 1816

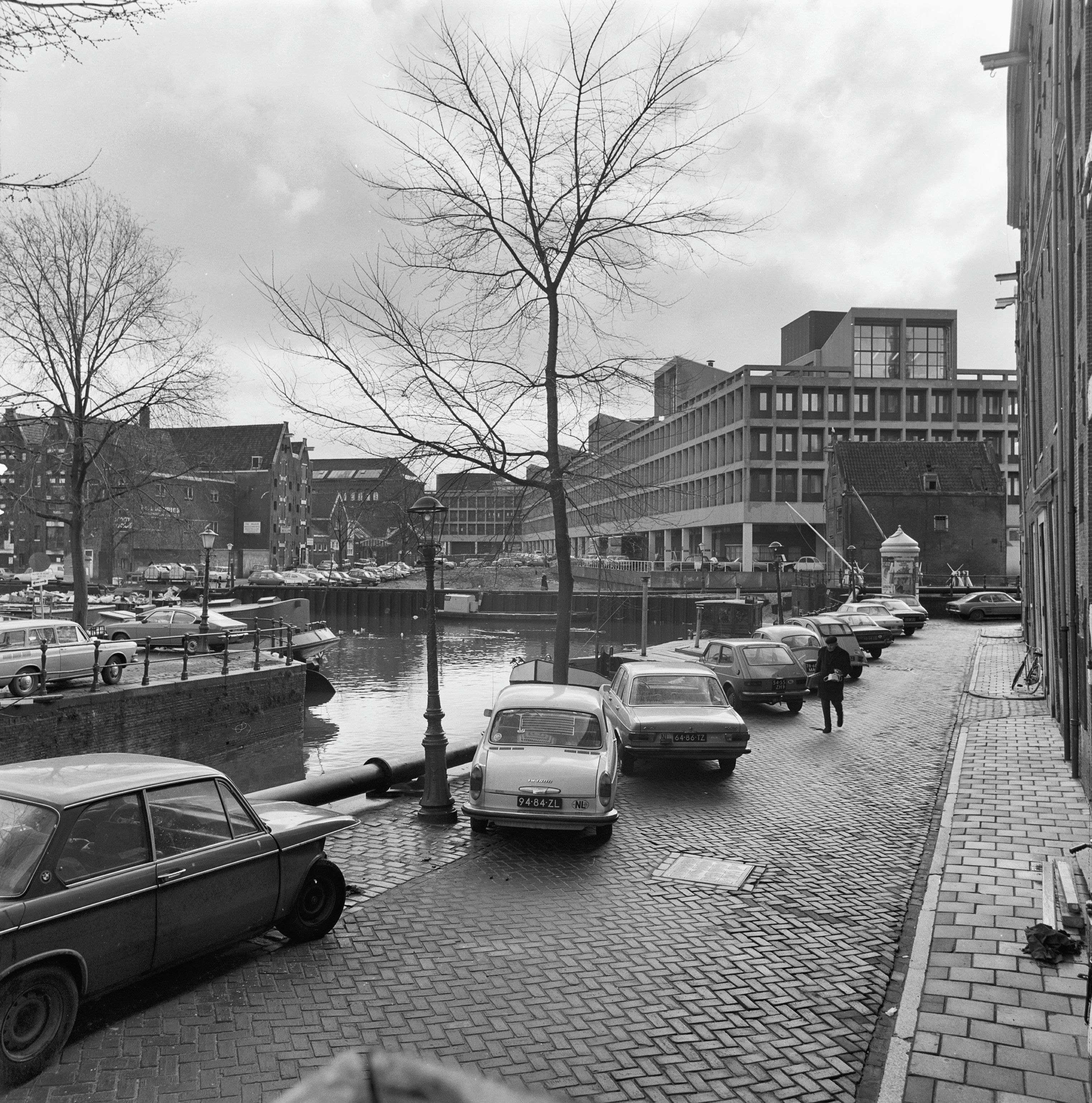
Houtkopersburgwal from Snoekjesbrug, 1976

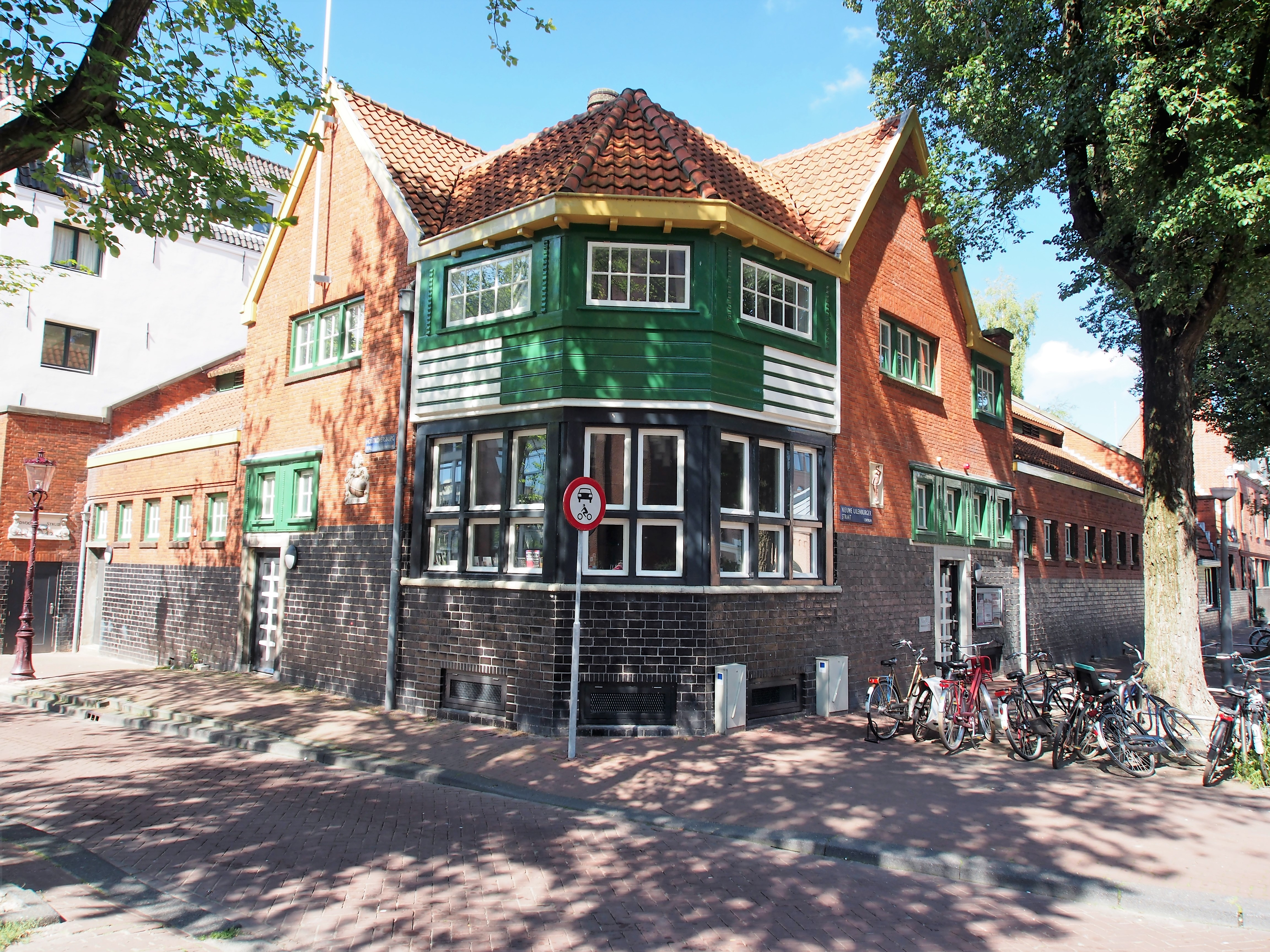
Houtkopersburgwal corner of the Nieuwe Uilenburgerstraat

== See also ==
- Canals of Amsterdam

== Sources ==
- Cees Boekraad (2001), "VaRa-strook/VaRa strip Amsterdam 1990-1999", Atelier Pro, Rotterdam, ISBN 9789064504327
- "De Houtkopersburgwal", amsterdamsebinnenstad.nl (in Dutch)
- Gerrit de Broen (1737), Amsterdam
- "Markengracht", Joodsamsterdam, 2 March 2017
