= Uilenburgergracht =

Canal in Amsterdam

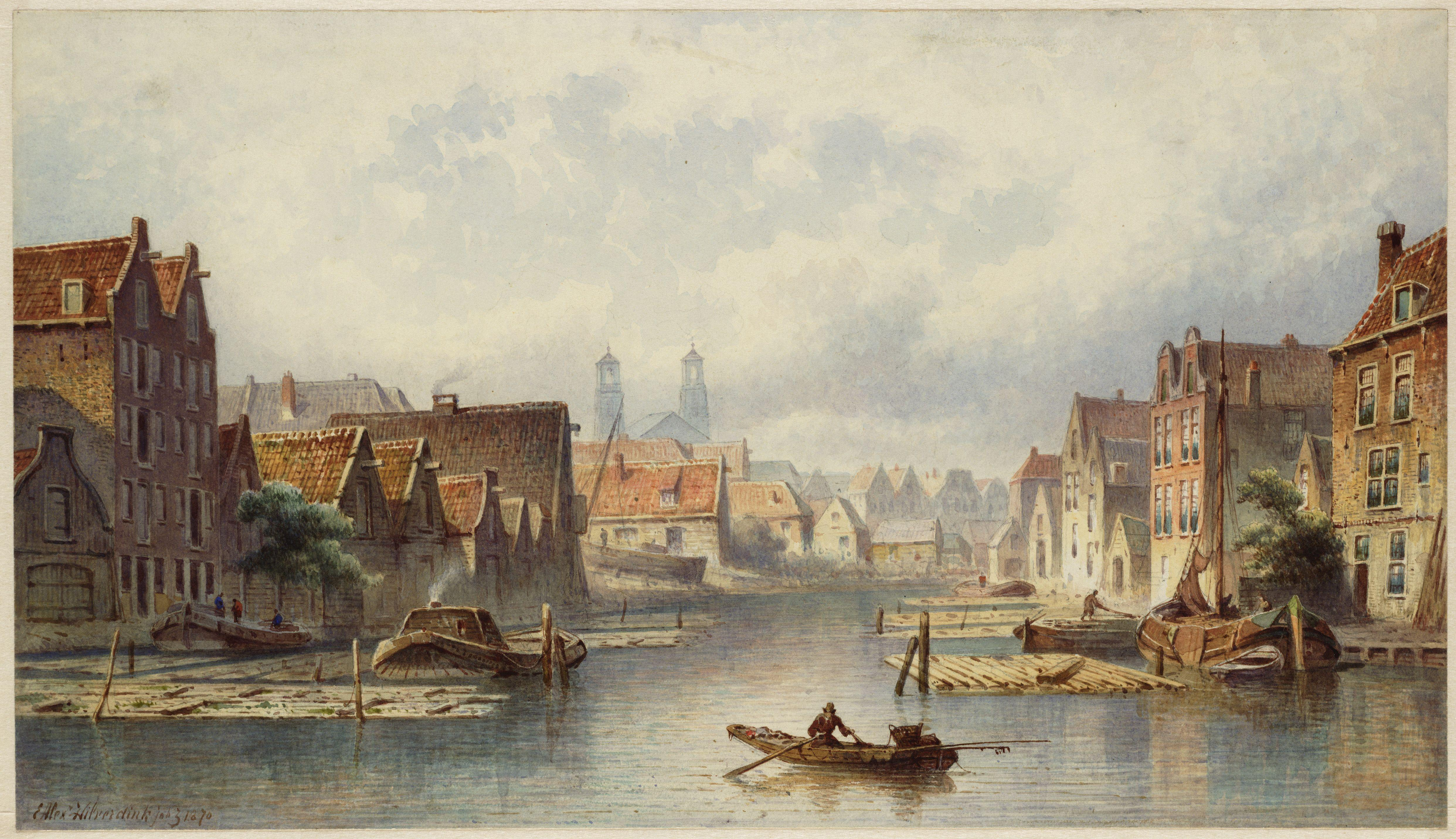
- Uilenburger canal, in the background the towers of the Moses and Aärons church. By Eduard Alexander Hilverdink (1870)

- Location within Amsterdam
- Location: Amsterdam
- Postal code: 1011
- Coordinates: 52.370097°N 4.905893°E

The Uilenburgergracht is a secondary canal in Amsterdam, the Netherlands. It is located east of the Amsterdam-Centrum district, in the Lastage neighborhood.

The Uilenburgergracht defines the southeastern border of Uilenburg Island. It is connected to Houtkopersburgwal and Rapenburgwal, which delimit the southwest and the northeast borders of the island. They lead to the Oudeschans canal along the northwest of the island.

The Uilenburgergracht was dug in 1593. In the nineteenth century, the newly created islands of Uilenburg, Valkenburg and Marken were the poorest neighborhoods of the Jewish quarter.

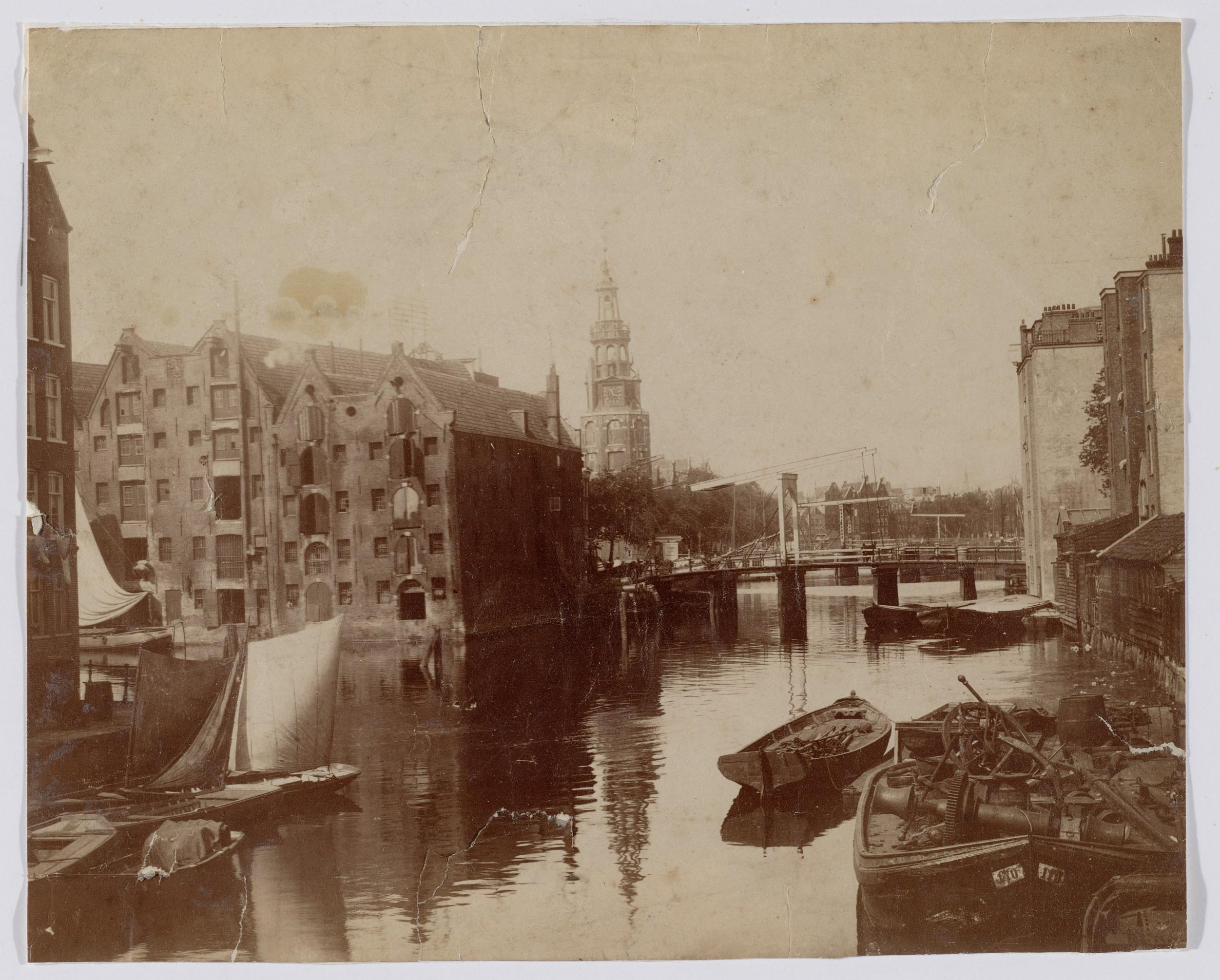
Rapenburgwal in the direction of Oude Schans. Left: Uilenburgergracht entrance. c. 1895

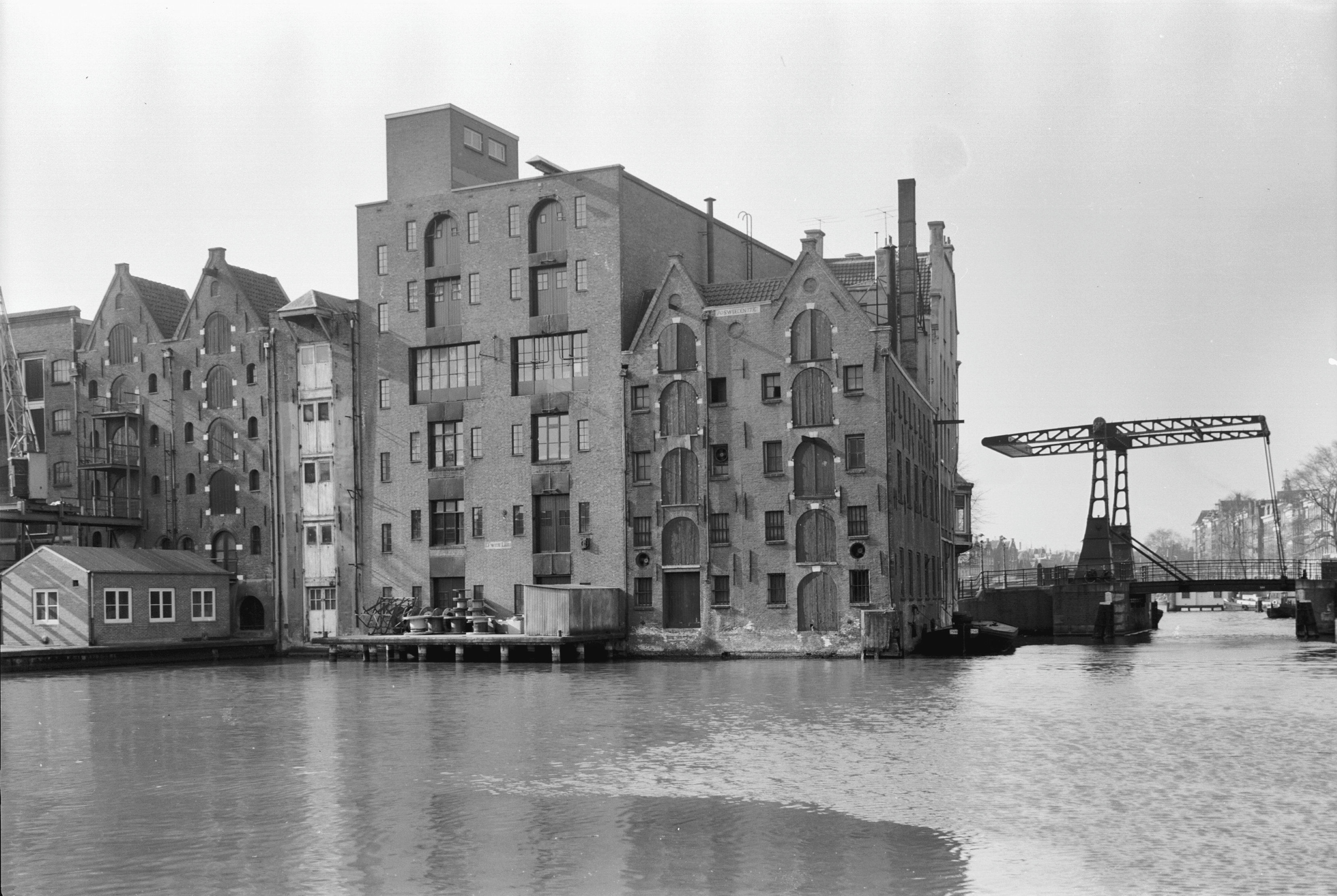
Rear facades with Peperbrug

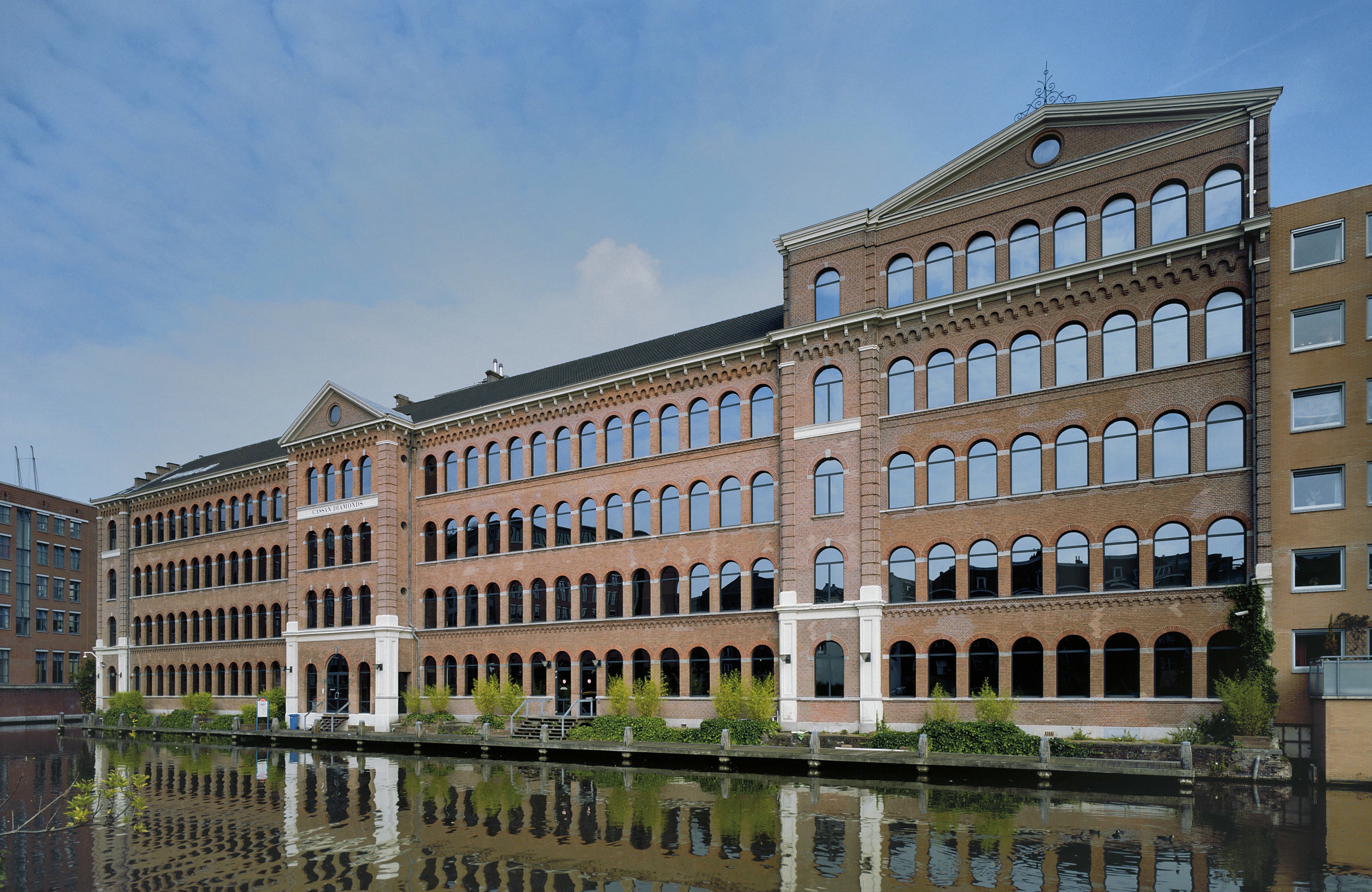
Nieuwe Uilenburgerstraat 173–175. Boas Diamond polishing: view over the water

== See also ==
- Canals of Amsterdam
