= Uilenburg =

Coordinates: 52°22′13″N 4°54′18″E

- Neighborhood of Amsterdam
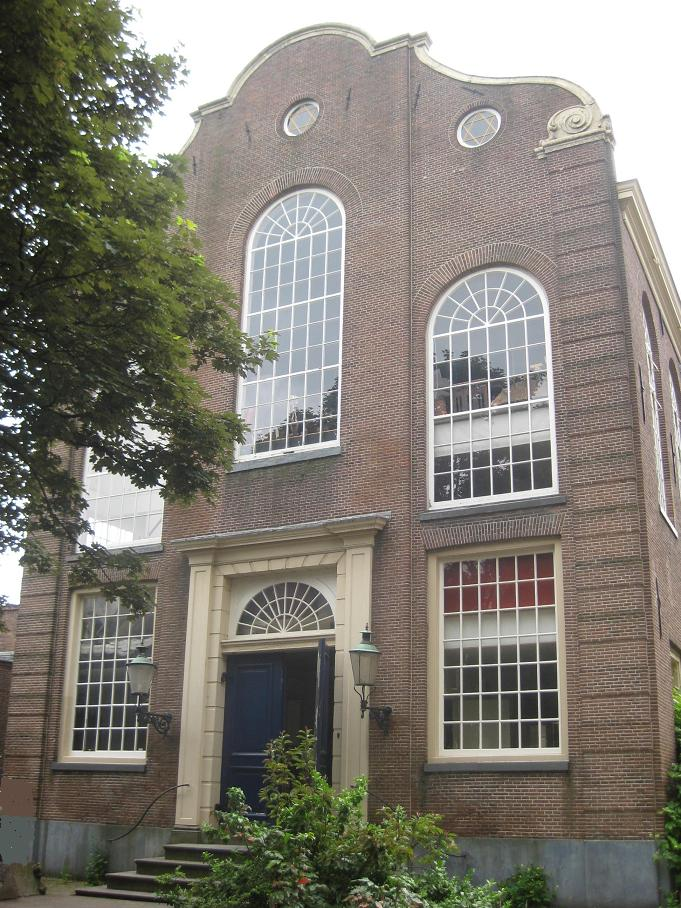
- Uilenburger Synagogue in Amsterdam
- Interactive map of Uilenburg
- Country: Netherlands
- Province: North Holland
- COROP: Amsterdam
- Time zone: UTC+1 (CET)

Uilenburg is a neighborhood of Amsterdam, Netherlands.

Uilenburg is an island surrounded by the Oudeschans canal to the northwest, the Houtkopersburgwal canal to the southwest, the Uilenburgergracht to the southeast and the Rapenburgwal to the northeast. The Nieuwe Uilenburgerstraat runs along the length of the island, crossing the Houtkopersburgwal and Uilenburgergracht by bridges.
