= Oudeschans, Amsterdam =

Canal in Amsterdam

Oudeschans
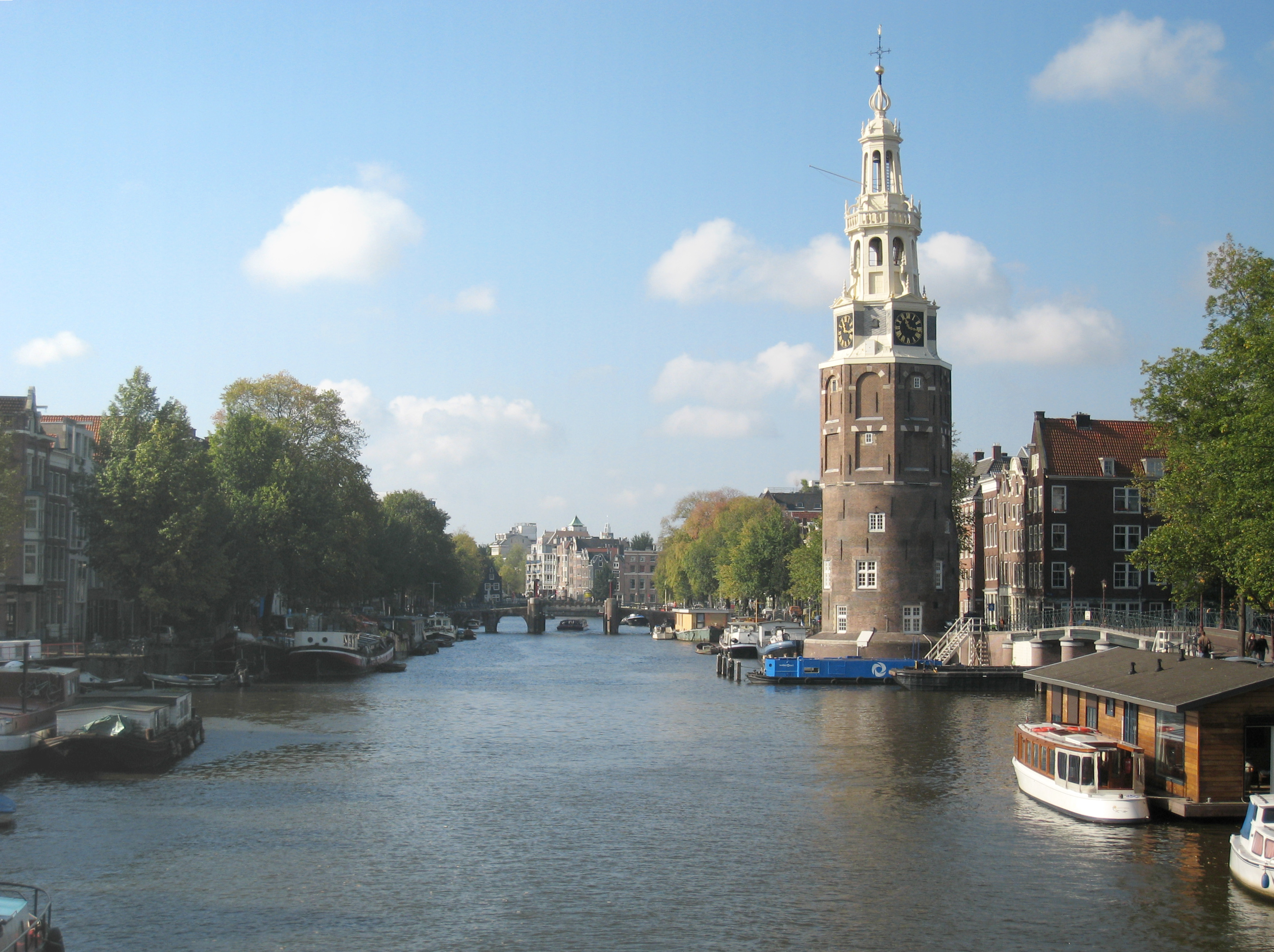
- The Oudeschans with Montelbaanstoren

- Location within Amsterdam
- Location: Amsterdam
- Postal code: 1011
- Coordinates: 52.371389°N 4.904722°E
- Southwest end: Sint Antoniesluis
- To: Oosterdok

The Oudeschans, or Oude Schans (Old Rampart), originally the Nieuwe Gracht, is a wide canal in the eastern part of the inner city of Amsterdam.

== Location ==
The Oudeschans canal continues the line of the Zwanenburgwal, to which it is connected by the Sint Antoniesluis, a lock that is crossed by the bridge where Sint Antoniesbreestraat turns into Jodenbreestraat. It runs northeast to the Oosterdok, which in turn is connected to the IJ. The 16th-century Montelbaanstoren is on the canal, which is sometimes called the Montelbaansgracht. The canal forms the western shore of the city island of Uilenburg on the border of the Lastage neighborhood .

The quays on either side of the canal are called Oudeschans, with the exception of the section between the Waalseilandgracht and the Oosterdok at the Prins Hendrikkade. There, the northeastern quay is called the Kalkmarkt and the opposite quay is called 's-Gravenhekje. Next to house number 10 there is a "corridor" to a back area on which the De Waag Playground is located. The artist Su Tomesen designed a gateway for this. The Snoekjesgracht, Rechtboomssloot and Waalseilandgracht open into the Oudeschans from the northwest. The Houtkopersburgwal and Rapenburgwal open into it from the southeast.

The odd-numbered southeast side of the Oudeschans lies on the island of Uilenburg, which can only be reached via three bridges:

- From the direction of Nieuwmarkt via Keizersbrug (bridge no. 286) at Korte Koningsstraat.
- From the direction of Jodenbreestraat via Steenvoetsluis (bridge 291) at the Nieuwe Uilenburgerstraat / Houtkopersburgwal,
- From the direction of Prins Hendrikkade / Rapenburg via the Peperbrug (bridge 281) at the Nieuwe Uilenburgerstraat / Peperstraat.

The Montelbaansbrug (bridge no. 280) is an extension of the even-numbered side of the Oudeschans over the Waalseilandsgracht at the Oude Waal and the Binnenkant. The Kikkerbilssluis (bridge no. 279) spans the water of the Oudeschans at the Prins Hendrikkade.

== History ==
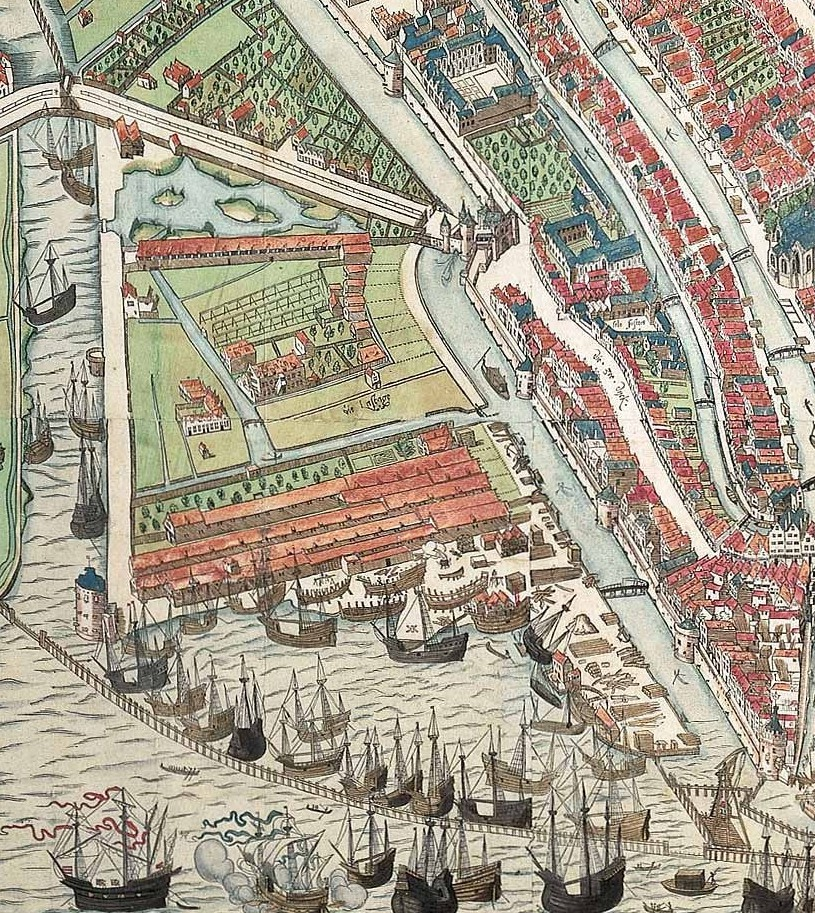
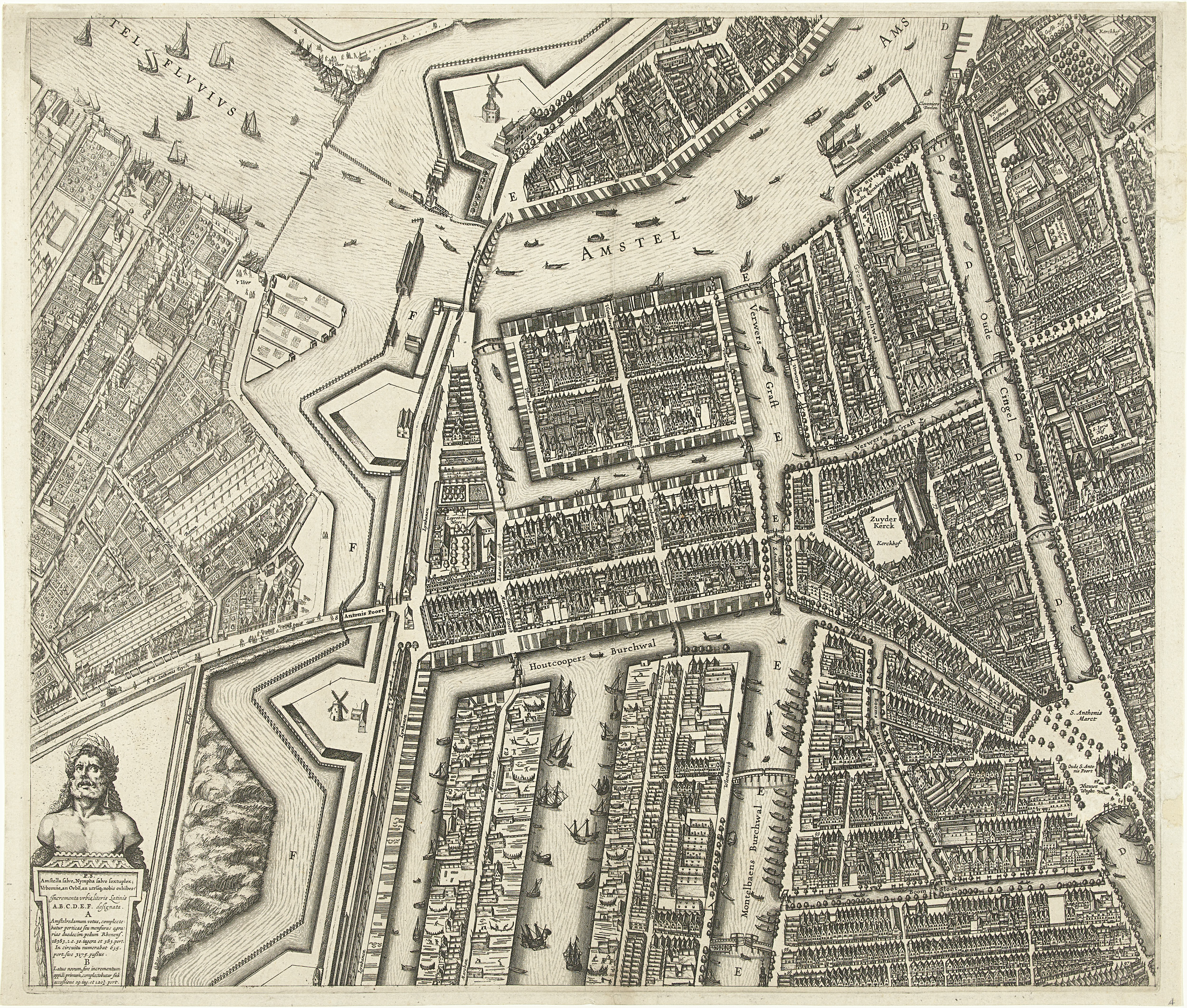
The Lastage between the Oudeschans (left) and Geldersekade. Detail of a woodcut by Cornelis Anthonisz. from 1544.

The Oudeschans (bottom right of the center) has become part of the city. On the right the Lastage; on the left the islands of Uilenburg and Valkenburg. Detail of van Berckenrode map from 1625.

In 1512, troops from Guelders attacked the city and plundered the Lastage, the industrial area with shipyards on the eastern side outside the city. Between 1515 and 1518 an armof the Amstel was dug out, the Zwanenburgwal, leading to the Nieuwe Gracht, as the Oudeschans was then called. This became the defensive moat for the east side of the city. A defensive wall was thrown up with the earth dug out, on which a wooden palisade was erected. The Montelbaan tower was built in 1516 as part of this defensive work.

At the end of the 16th century, during the Second Expansion, three islands southeast of the Nieuwe Gracht were included: Uilenburg, Marken (later called Valkenburg ) and Rapenburg. When a new city wall was erected to defend against the Spanish, it included the new islands. The Nieuwe Gracht and the old redoubt lost its defensive function.

In 1602 a channel was cut through the Sint Antoniesdijk on the south side of the Oudeschans, and the Sint Antoniesluis (a lock) was built so that ships could sail to the Amstel via the Zwanenburgwal.

The West-Indian warehouse is on the 's-Gravenhekje, where the Oudeschans flows into the Oosterdok. This monumental complex, built in 1642, was the headquarters of the Dutch West India Company between 1646 and 1674.

In 1833, after a rumor that ghosts had been seen, the Oudeschans was nicknamed the ghost quay.

The Oudeschans and the parallel Nieuwe Uilenburgerstraat, were located in the heart of the old Jodenbuurt (Jewish neighborhood) of Amsterdam.

In 1927 the municipality built a block of 72 homes in the style of the late Amsterdam School in collaboration with the Bouwfonds Handwerkers Vriendenkring. The block was designed by Jan Hendrik Mulder Jr. (1888–1960) and built on the Oudeschans / Nieuwe Uilenburgerstraat. The ground floor areas, with the monumental natural stone entrance at Oudeschans 21, were originally designed as storage for the goods, stalls and carts of the Jewish street market on Nieuwe Uilenburgerstraat, which was popular before World War II. The complex is used as an exhibition and studio space, and offers space for artists and young entrepreneurs.

The Korendrager warehouse on Oudeschans 73-77 was destroyed by fire in 1949. Between 1974 and 2004, the Bimhuis stood here. When this concert hall for jazz and improvised music had found a new home in the Muziekgebouw aan 't IJ, an apartment building was built on the site in 2007 based on a design by Tekton architects.

== Notable residents ==
Jan Swammerdam lived at Oudeschans 18, where his father, who was known for his natural history collection, had a pharmacy .

Between 1887 and 1888, the painter Willem Witsen rented the studio in Oudeschans 5 formerly used by George Hendrik Breitner. The Montelbaanstoren and Oudeschans were a favorite subject that he drew and painted from his window.

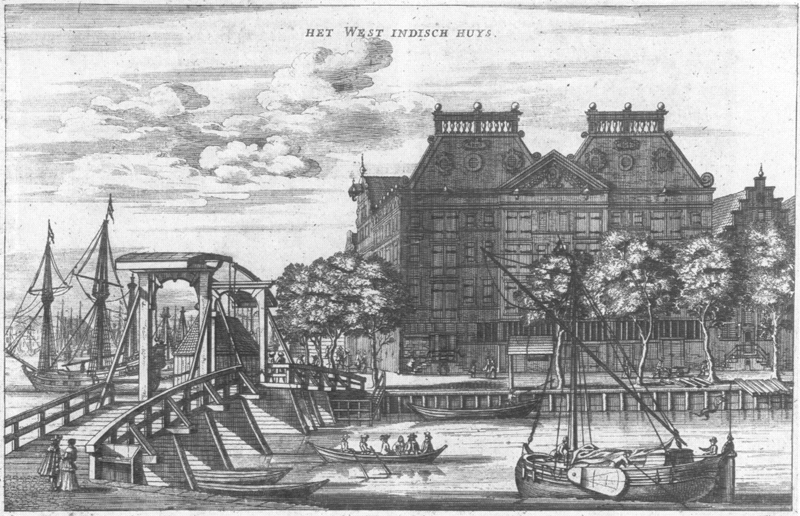
The West-Indian warehouse, Oudeschans, on the left the Oosterdok. Engraving 1655.

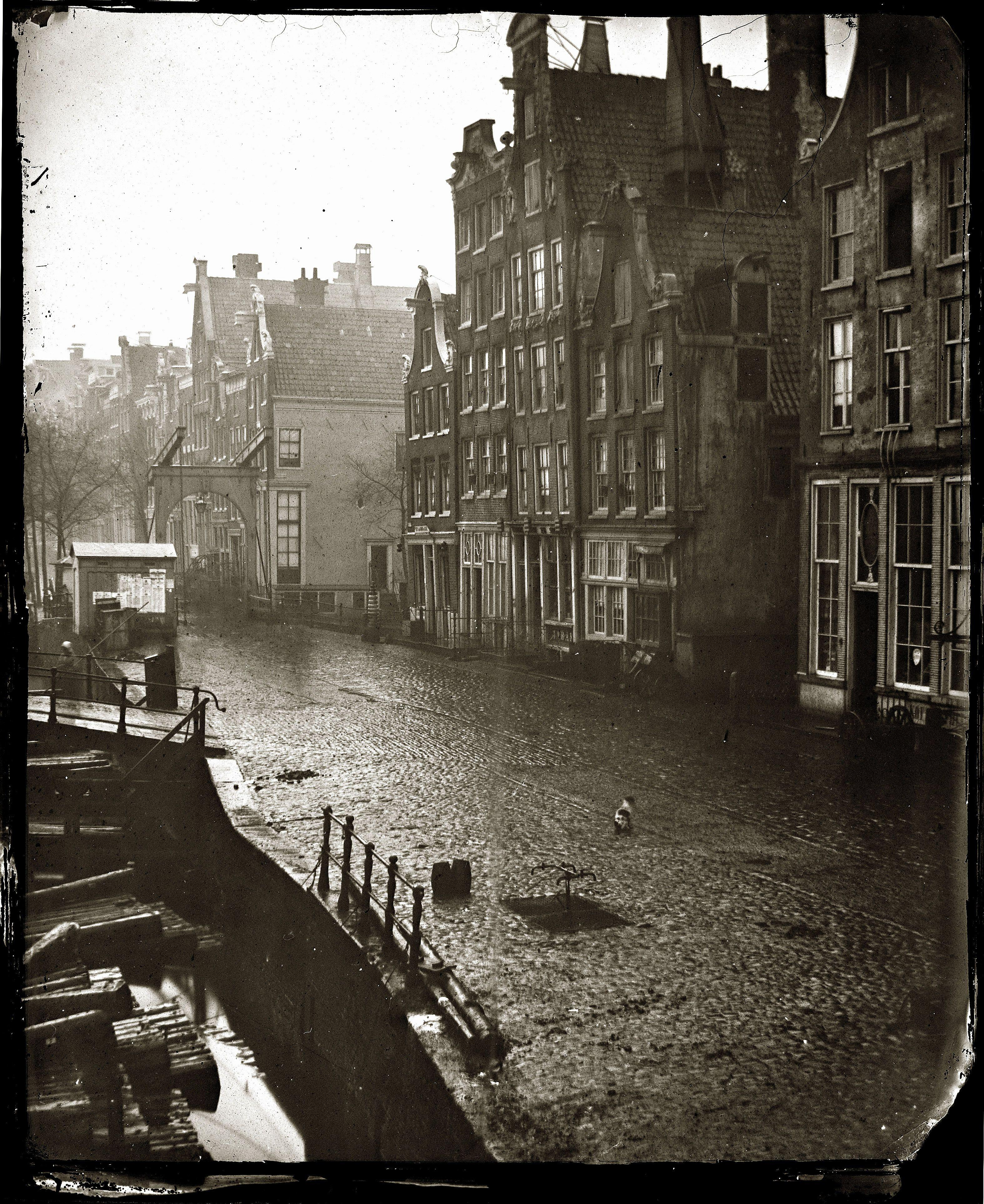
The Oudeschans. Photo: Jacob Olie, 1863.

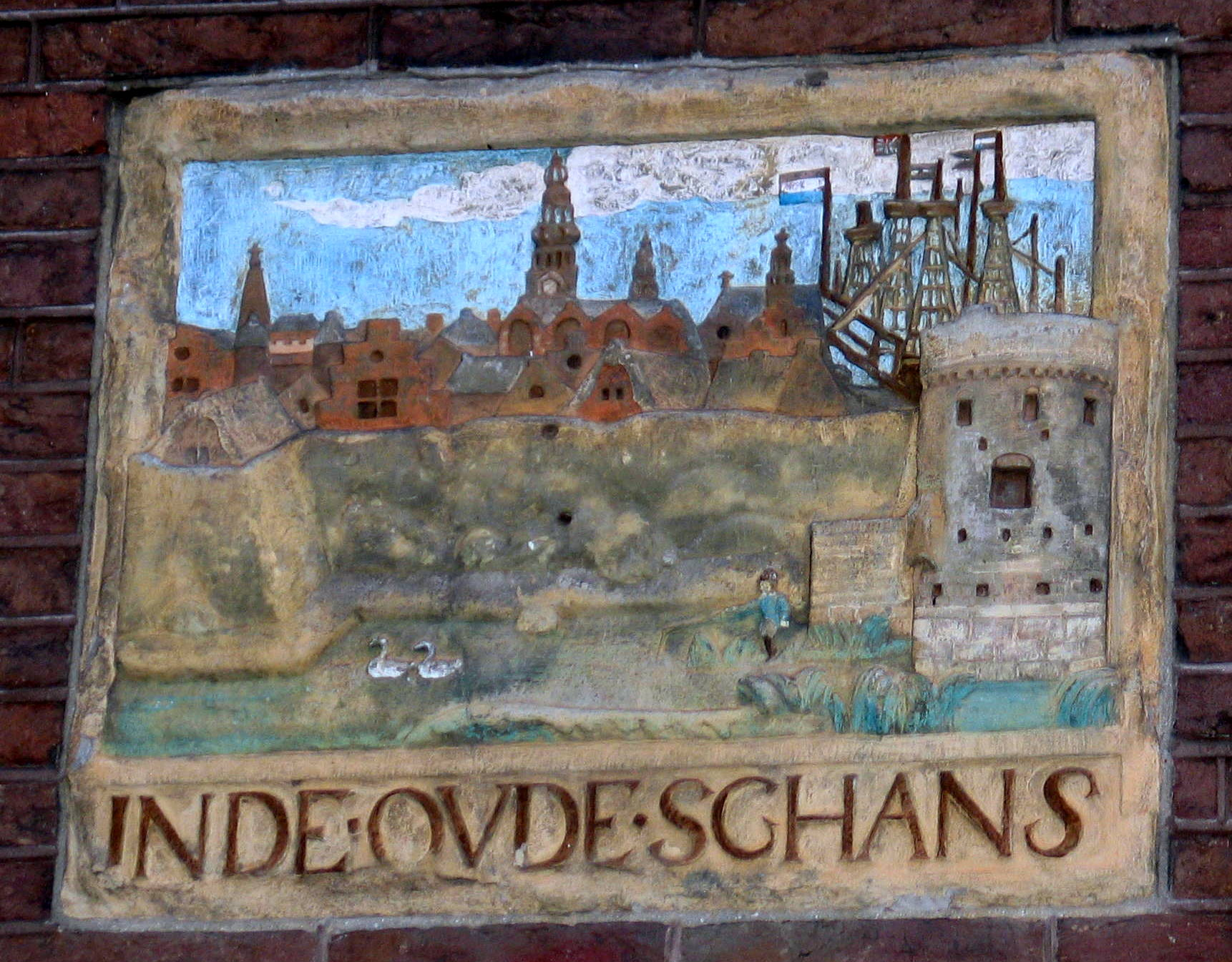
Gable stone on 'In the Old Schans' in the wall of the Amsterdam Museum

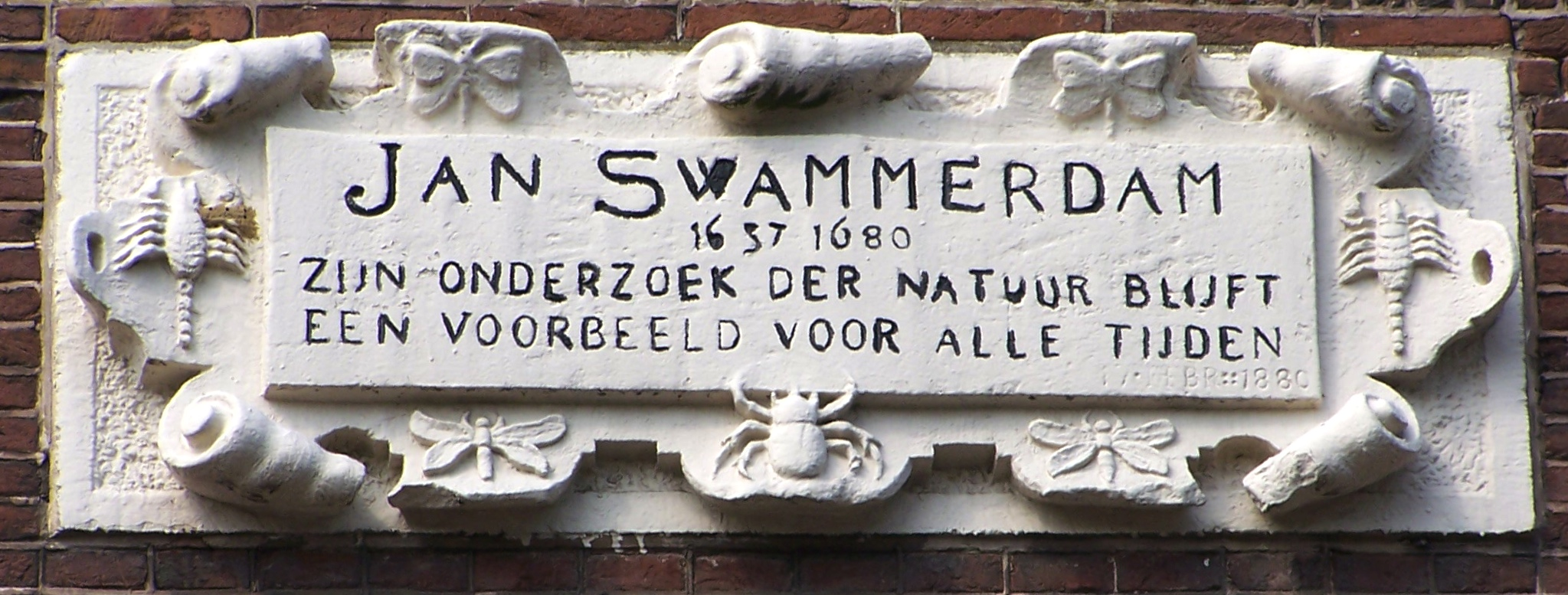
Gable stone on the house of Jan Swammerdam, Oudeschans 18.

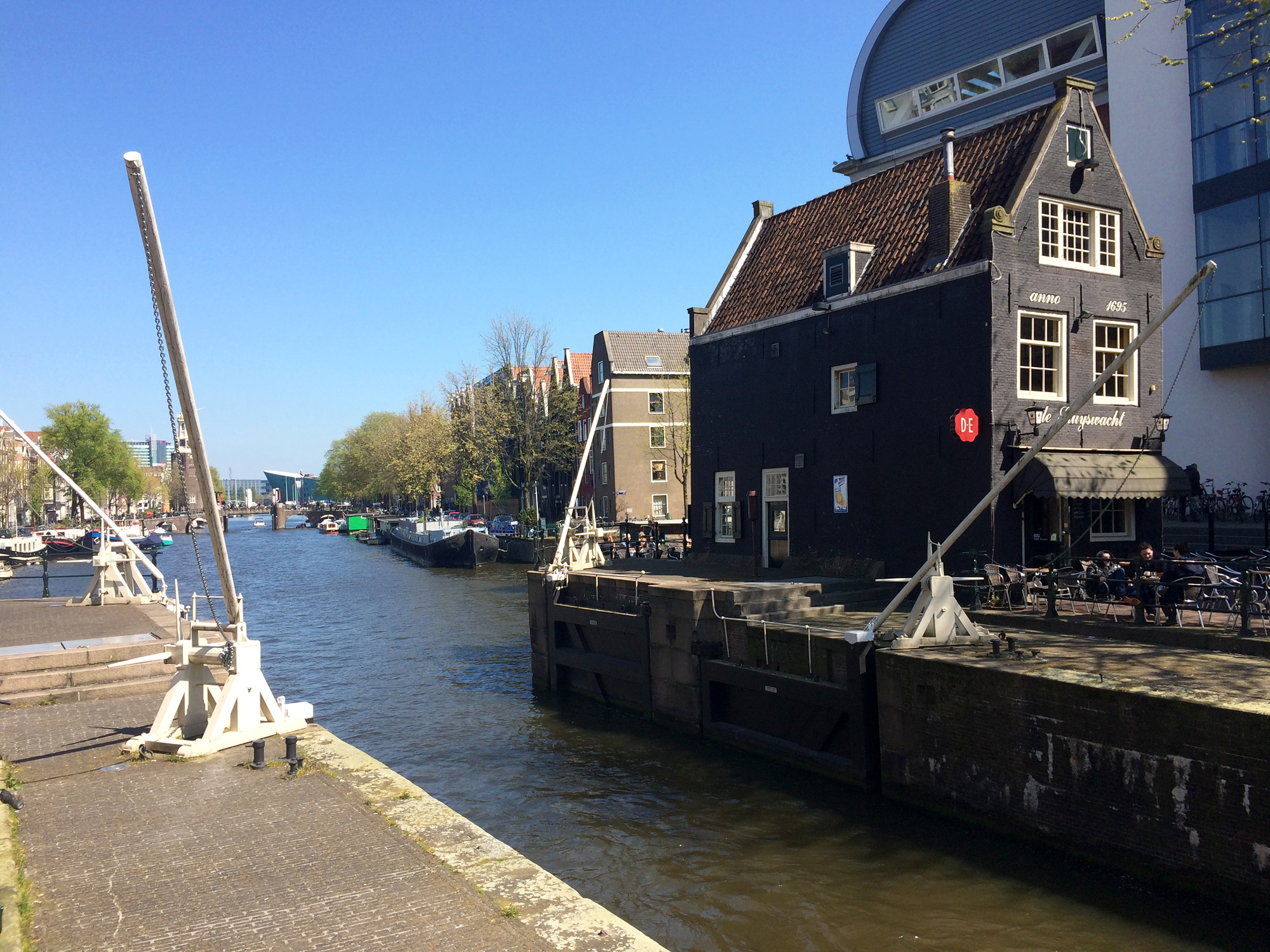
The Oudeschans seen from the Sint Antoniesluis

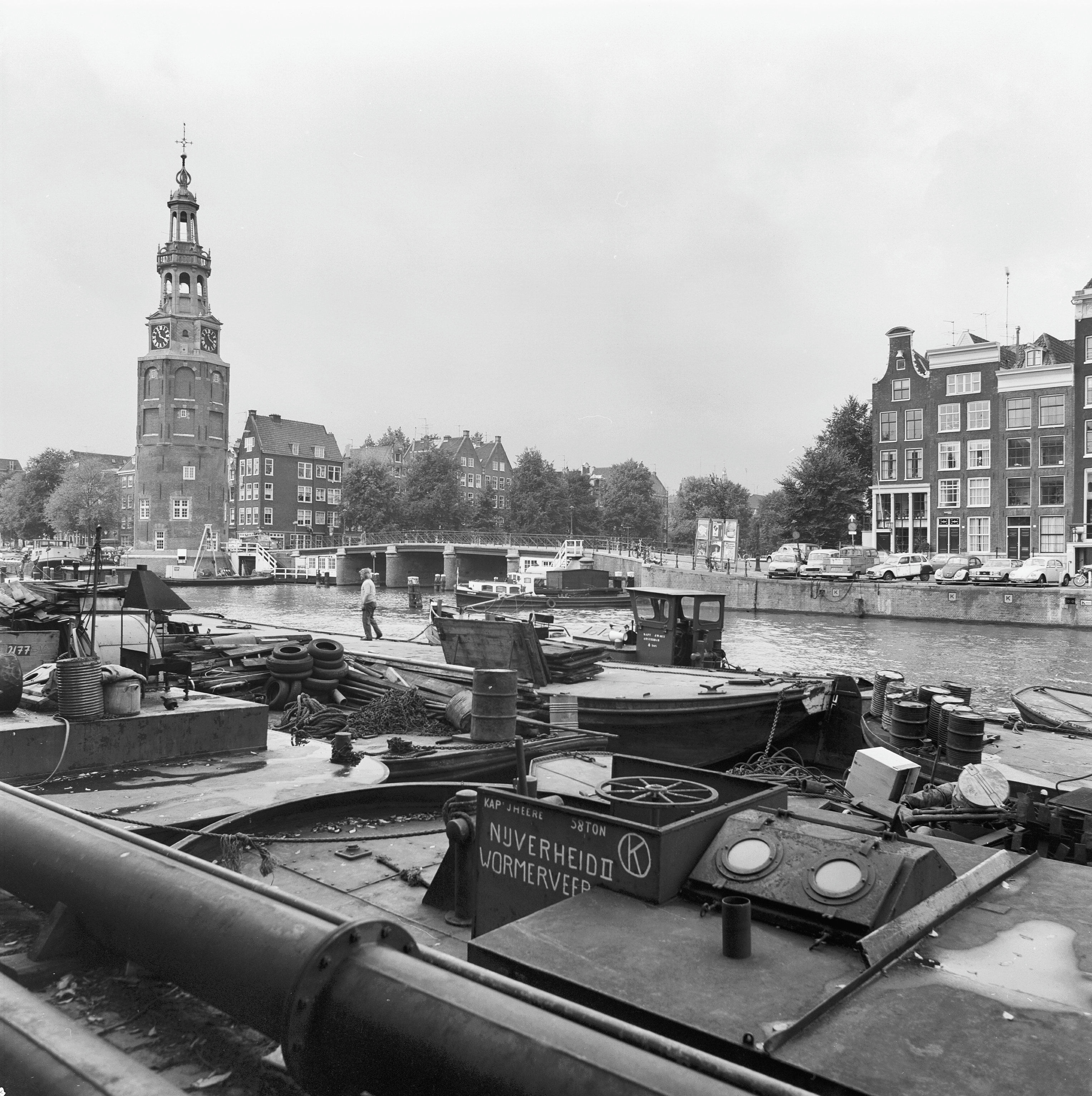
The Oudeschans with Montelbaan tower, seen from the 's-Gravenhekje.

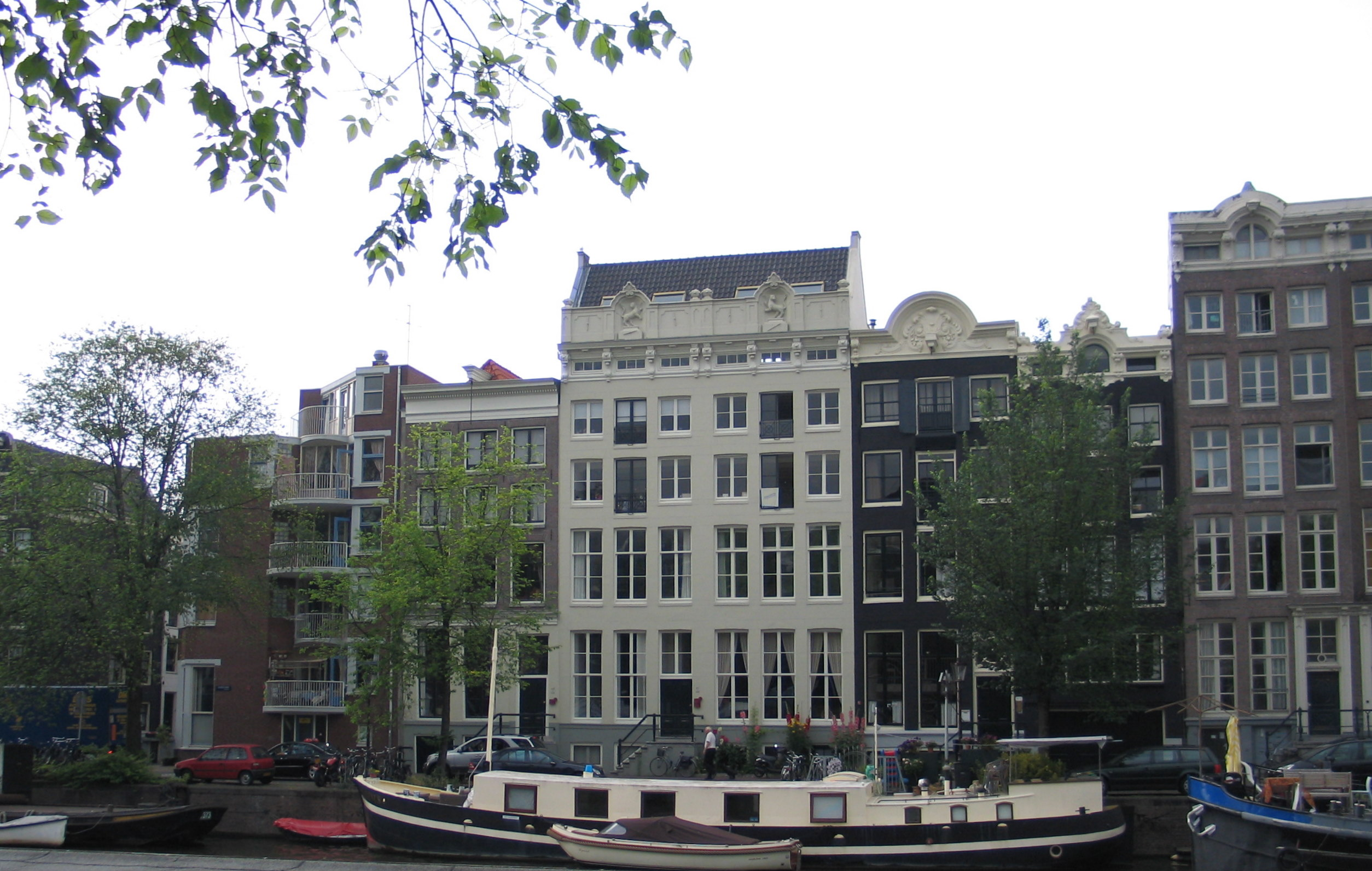
Oudeschans with the double building De Twee Tijgers, home of Constantin Ranst de Jonge.

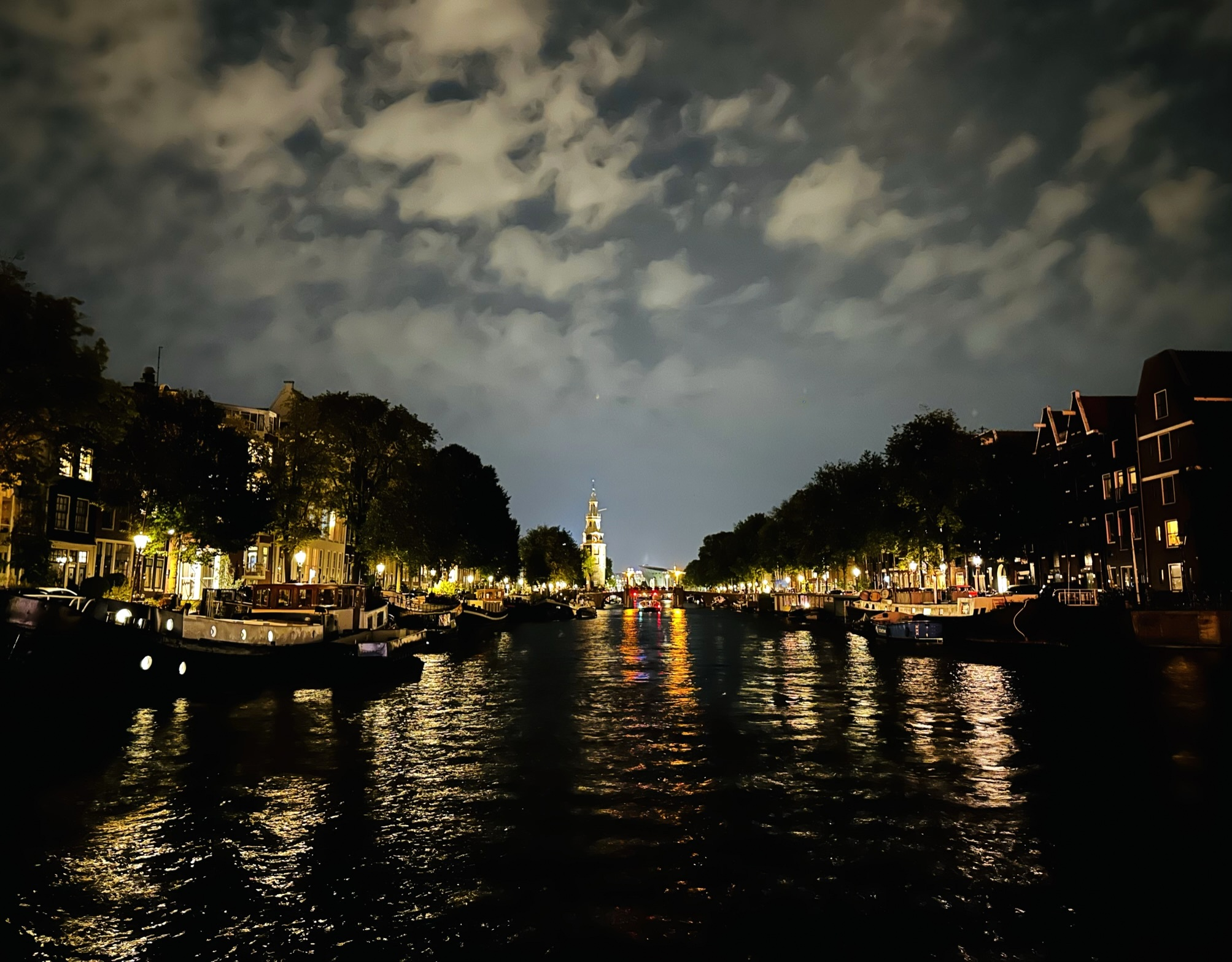
Oudeschans at night with Montelbaanstoren in the distance

Video of Oudeschans, looking north from Keizersbrug.

== See also ==
- Canals of Amsterdam

== Sources ==
- De Oudeschans op Erfgoed van de Week, www.amsterdam.nl
- Foto's van de Oudeschans in de Beeldbank van het Stadsarchief Amsterdam Archived 2019-07-24 at the Wayback Machine
- Montelbaanstoren, Oudeschans 2; op www.amsterdam.nl
- Gezicht van de Geesteverschijning op de Oude Schans den 8 en 9 Oct. 1833 te Amsterdam
