= Peperstraat, Amsterdam =

Street in Amsterdam, Netherlands

Peperstraat
- Peperstraat seen from the junction with Rapenburg (2023)
- Interactive map of Peperstraat
- Namesake: Peperwerf
- Location: Amsterdam, Netherlands
- Postal code: 1011 TJ, 1011 TL
- Coordinates: 52°22′19″N 4°54′29″E
- From: Prins Hendrikkade
- To: Peperbrug

Peperstraat is a short street on the island of Rapenburg in the inner city of Amsterdam, the Netherlands. It runs south-west from the Prins Hendrikkade to the Peperbrug bridge over the Rapenburgwal. Beyond the bridge it continues south-west as the Nieuwe Uilenburgerstraat towards Waterlooplein.

The street is named after the Peperwerf ("Pepper Wharf"), a wharf which lay on the site of the present street. The Peperwerf belonged to the warehouses of the Dutch East India Company (Vereenigde Oostindische Compagnie, VOC), where imported spices and other goods were stored.

== History ==
The island of Rapenburg was created between 1592 and 1596 as part of the Second Expansion (Tweede Uitleg) of Amsterdam and was intended for shipbuilding. From 1608 the Dutch East India Company (VOC) was based in the north of the island, with a large slipway, a ropewalk, a tar house and a pharmacy. This VOC yard was also known as the Peperwerf. Shortly after 1660 the yard was moved to Oostenburg, an island that had only just been built. The former VOC site on Rapenburg was auctioned off in 1670 and repurposed for the construction of houses.

In 1920 the sack dealer M. Vischjager en Zonen was located at number 10; in October that year a fire broke out in the business for the third time. In September 1921 the business, on the corner with Rapenburg, burnt out completely.

== Monuments ==
Peperstraat 8 is an 18th-century house with a neck gable, the top of which is incomplete, set on a carriage-house front (koetshuispui). It has held national monument (rijksmonument) status since 1976.

The Peperbrug over the Rapenburgwal is a single-leaf drawbridge with two navigation openings. It dates from 1929 and became a rijksmonument in 2002.

The 17th-century West-Indisch Pakhuis, a complex of warehouses of the Dutch West India Company, has two gables with oeils-de-boeuf on the Peperstraat side. On the corner with the Prins Hendrikkade stands its former office (commiesgebouw), probably built around 1690, with a blank wall facing Peperstraat.

Also on the corner with the Prins Hendrikkade, at Prins Hendrikkade 159 A, stands the former office of the Netherland Line (Stoomvaart-Maatschappij Nederland), built in 1902–1903 and listed as a rijksmonument in 2001.

== Gallery ==
Peperstraat 2–6 seen from the Prins Hendrikkade, print by L.W.R. Wenckebach, 1906

Shipping office on the corner of Peperstraat and Prins Hendrikkade, 1983

Peperstraat 8, 2012

Peperstraat, February 2021

Peperbrug looking towards Peperstraat, 2023
