= IJtunnel =

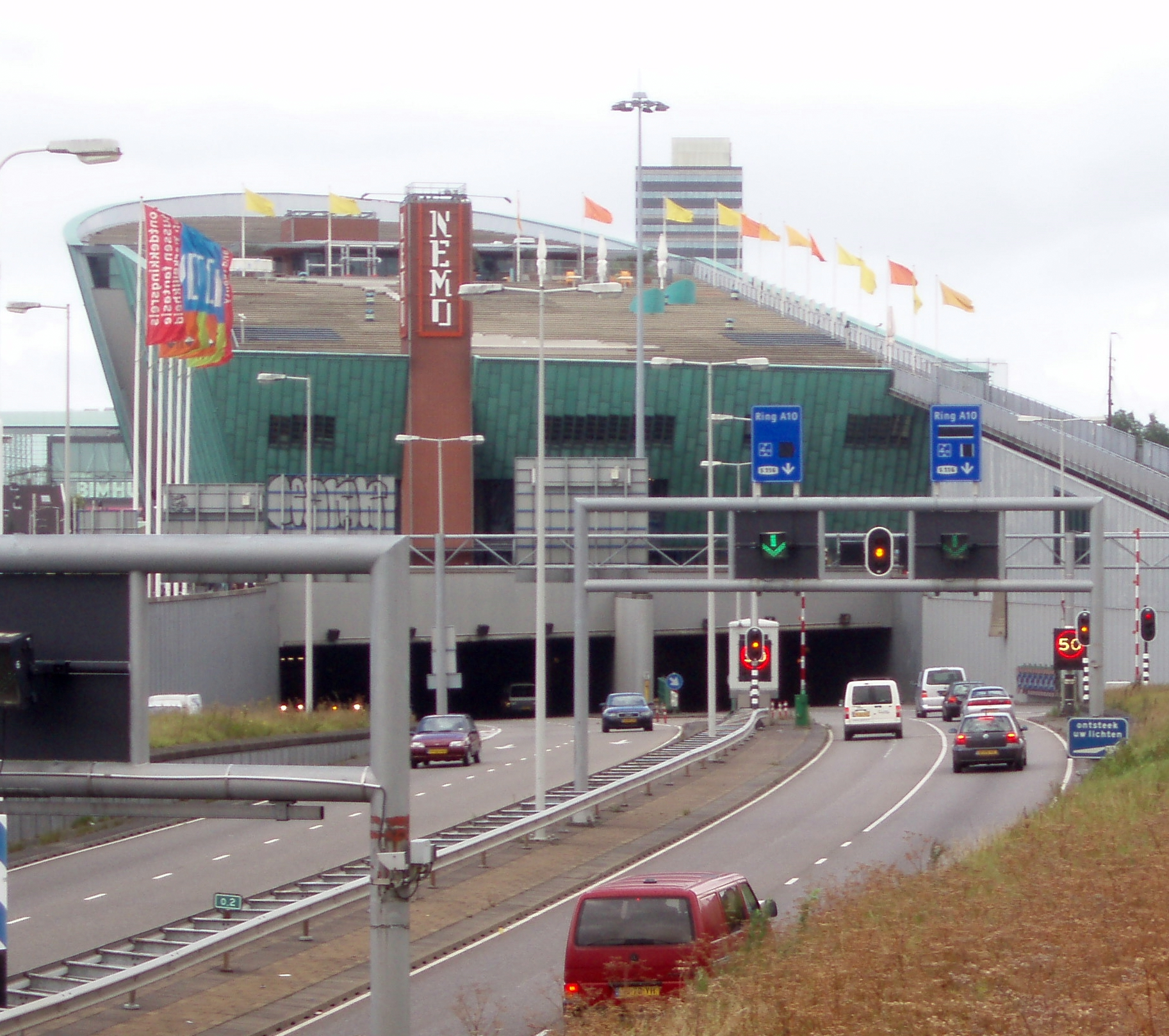

Overview
- Location: IJ
- Coordinates: 52°22′47″N 4°54′39″E
- Start: Centre of Amsterdam
- End: Amsterdam-Noord

Operation
- Opened: 30 October 1968 (built 1957-1968)
- Character: Submerged automobile tunnel

Technical
- Length: 1,682 m

The IJtunnel, opened on 30 October 1968, is an automobile tunnel under the IJ that connects the centre of Amsterdam with Amsterdam-Noord. The tunnel is part of a route across Amsterdam that connects the Ringweg North with the Ringweg South near Duivendrecht, via Nieuwe Leeuwarderweg, Valkenburgerstraat, Weesperstraat, Wibautstraat and Gooiseweg (S112).

The total length of the tunnel, including on- and off-ramps, is 1682 metres. The covered part is 1039 metres long. The deepest point of the tunnel lies 20.32 metres below sea-level. The tunnel was built of sections of rectangular concrete constructions of 24.8 x 8.75 metres, subdivided into two tubes for automobile traffic and in between tubes for cables and pipes.

Ventilators, located in two ventilation buildings on the banks of the IJ, blow clean air into the traffic areas via tubes under the surface of the road and openings in the tunnel walls, and suck polluted air out. At the entrance on the north side there are sun-blocking lattices over the road. These lattices are missing on the south side, where the Nemobuilding is built on top of the tunnel. The traffic in the tunnel is monitored by 22 closed-circuit cameras. A heating system prevents the forming of ice on the surface of the road, and a computer regulates the intensity of light at the beginning and the end of the tunnel, so that a gradual transition from tunnel light to daylight takes place.

The route through the IJtunnel is an urban avenue, formed out of two divided tunnels, each with two lanes of traffic. This four-lane road continues to the A10 in the north and to the Prins Hendrikkade in the south, where it is reduced to two lanes, one in each direction.

== Access restrictions ==
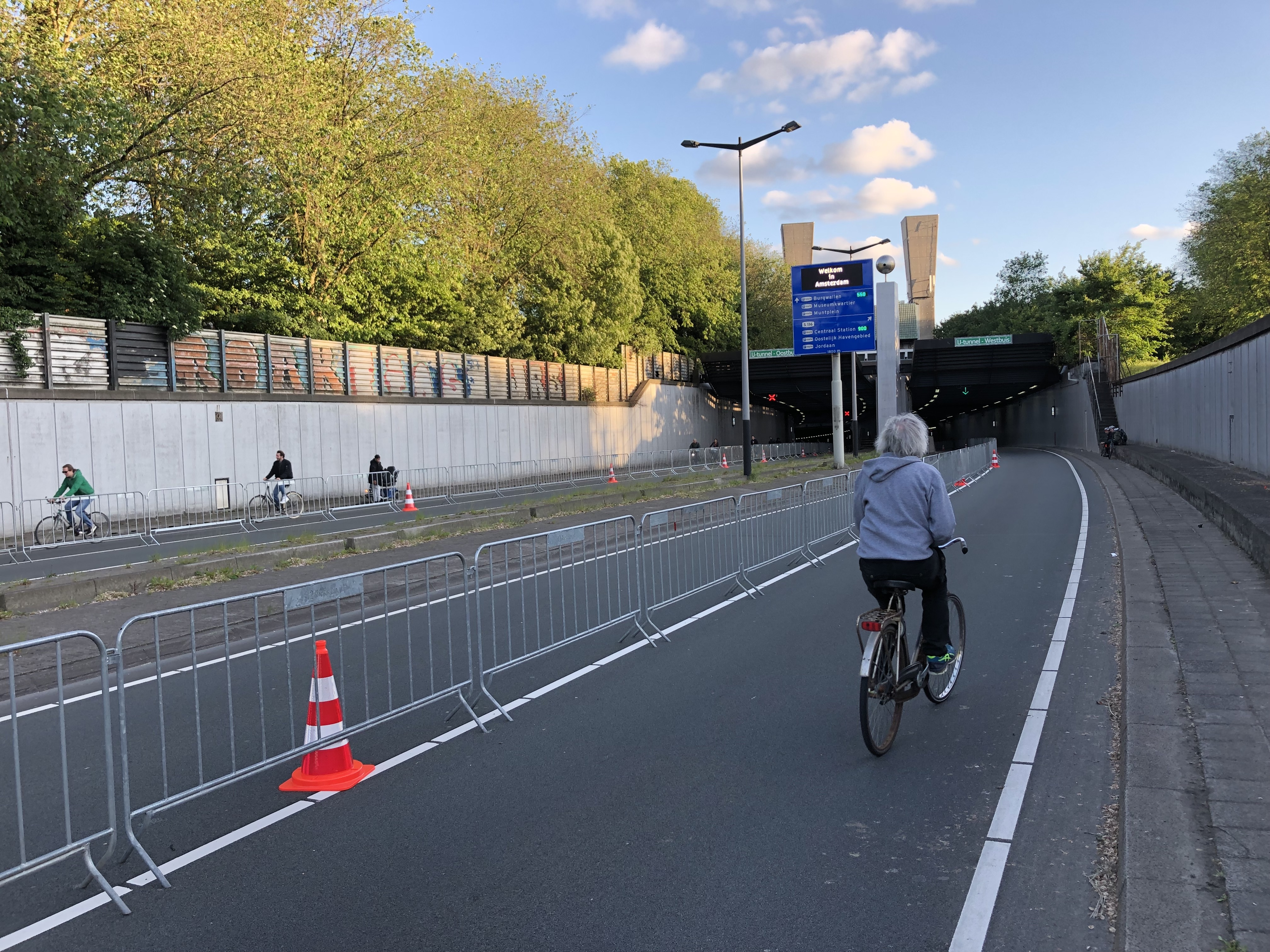
On 28 May 2019, the IJtunnel was opened to pedestrians, bicycles and mopeds, when public transport and ferry services across the IJ were suspended due to industrial action.

The IJtunnel is a class D tunnel under the ADR treaty. The classification means that no one may use the tunnel to transport dangerous goods that may cause a large explosion, or a large toxic release, or a large fire. The tunnel is also an entry point to Amsterdam's low emission zone, and there is a height limit of 4 meters.

Pedestrians, agricultural vehicles, bicycles and mopeds are generally not allowed to use the IJtunnel. However, the ban on pedestrians, bicycles and mopeds may be temporarily lifted if public transport and ferry services across the IJ are suspended: such a situation occurred in 1993, 1997, 2005 and 28 May 2019. There was also a special open day on 26 October 1968, to mark the opening of the tunnel. The tunnel is also used by runners during the annual Dam tot Damloop.
