= Land register building (Amsterdam) =

Building in Amsterdam

The former Land Register in Amsterdam is a well-known building situated on the Prins Hendrikkade in the center of Amsterdam, opposite Amsterdam Central Railway Station.

The former land register building and the Lloyd Building on the Oostelijke Handelskade in Amsterdam serve as reminders of the Royal Dutch Lloyd in their name and details in both the interior and exterior. Opened in 1920, the building initially served as the headquarters of the Royal Dutch Lloyd shipping company. Later, it housed the communal land register before relocating, at which point the building was rented out for office space.

Long-standing plans exist to convert the building into a 4-star hotel. The hotel would have approximately 100 guest rooms; the basement area designated for cultural and social activities.

Some individuals oppose additional hotel space in central Amsterdam, arguing thatthere are enough hotels in the area. However, the hotel project remains on track for construction, as no other tenants could be found for the building.
