= Martelaarsgracht =

Canal in Amsterdam

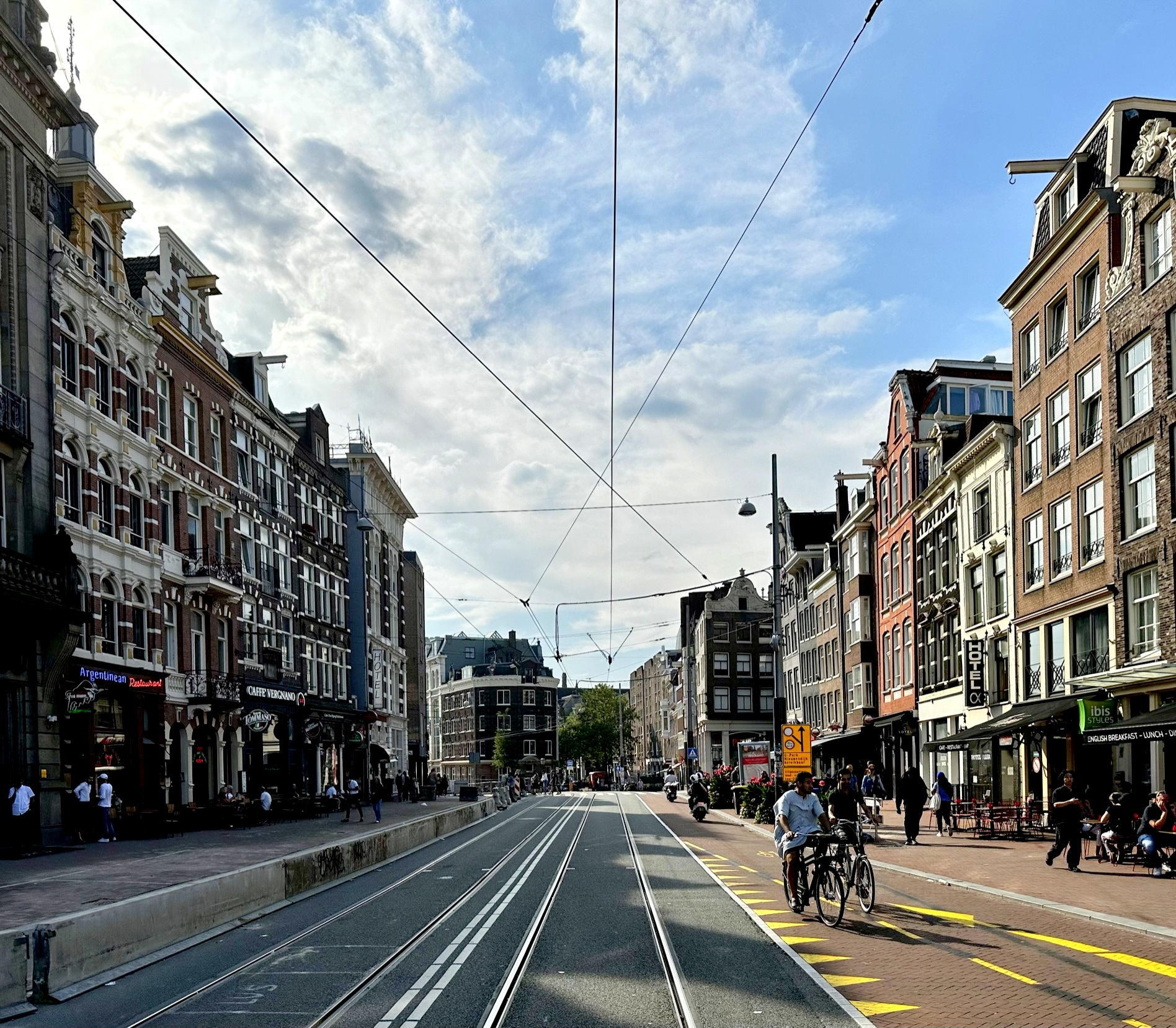
- The Martelaarsgracht in 2023

- Location within Amsterdam
- Location: Amsterdam
- Postal code: 1012
- Coordinates: 52.377889°N 4.896344°E
- West end: Nieuwezijds Voorburgwal
- To: Prins Hendrikkade

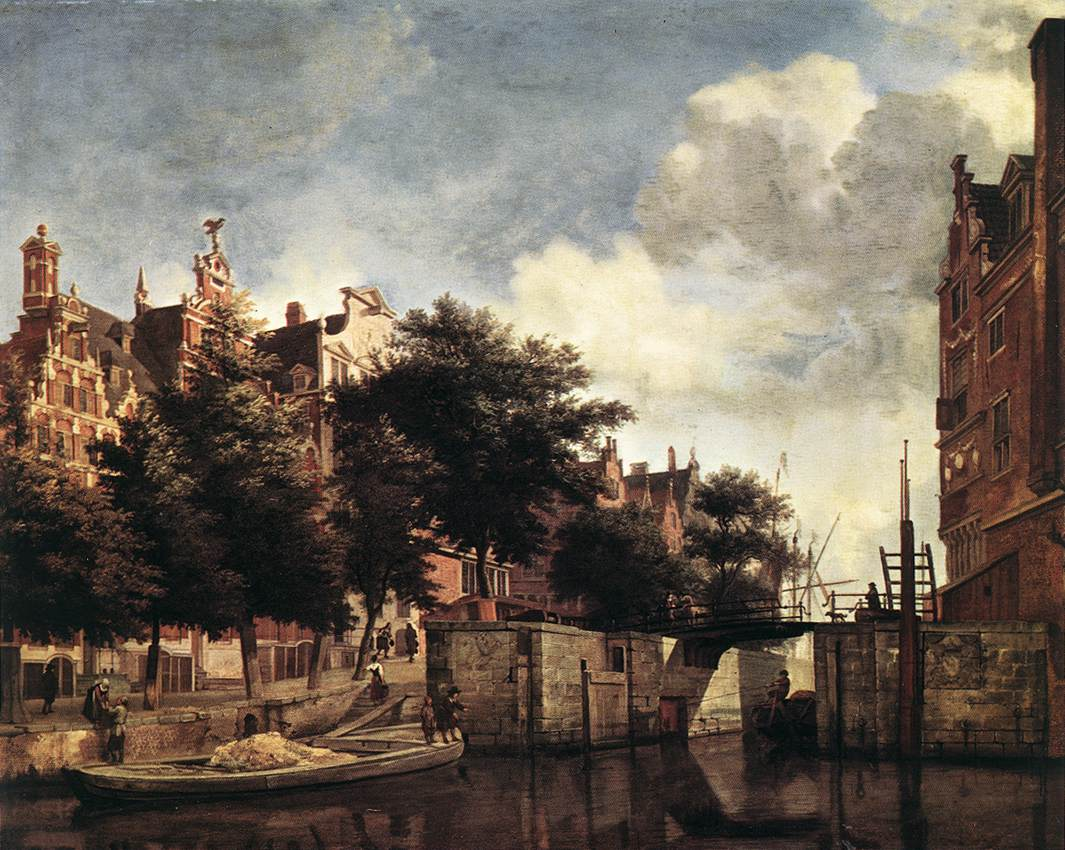
The Martelaarsgracht with Oude Haarlemmersluis; circa 1670. Painting by Jan van der Heyden

Martelaarsgracht (Martyr's Canal) is a street and former canal in Amsterdam, the Netherlands.

== Location ==
The Martelaarsgracht is an extension of the Nieuwezijds Voorburgwal and runs in a northeastern direction to the Prins Hendrikkade and the Stationsplein in front of Central Station. Hekelveld square separates the Martelaarsgracht from the Spuistraat. The Martelaarsgracht has been a short but wide and busy street since the canal was filled in 1884, and has been an electric tram route since 1906. The street has a central reservation with escape walls for the tram, but there is no longer a stop. There are, among other things, hotels, snack bars and internet cafés.

== Origin of the name ==
The origin of the remarkable name is unknown. There are, however, different theories. The place could have been used as a gallows field, but there are no sources for that. According to the Amsterdam City Archives, there would once have been a house with a signboard depicting a martyr. In an old source there is a building "where the martyr hung".

== History ==
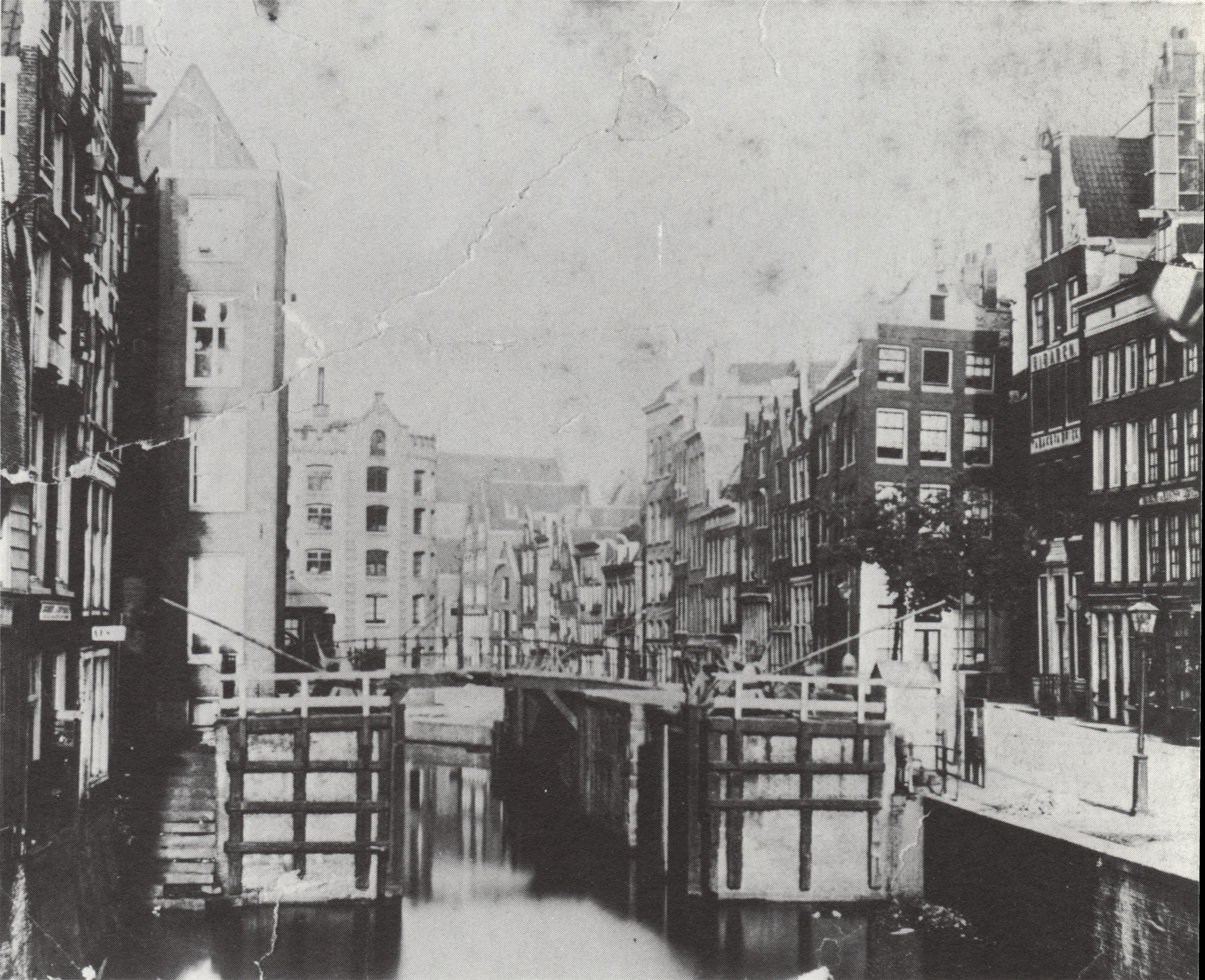
The Oude Haarlemmersluis with Martelaar Bridge at the Nieuwendijk; before the infill in 1884

The first Haarlemmerpoort stood on the spot where Martelaarsgracht and Nieuwendijk now meet. Around 1400 the bank of the IJ must have been at the level of the current plot boundary between Martelaarsgracht 6 and 8. When part of the IJ north of the area was filled in at the beginning of the 15th century, the canal came to lie within the city walls. Afterwards the water from the Nieuwezijds Voorburgwal and that of the Nieuwezijds Achterburgwal flowed through the Martelaarsgracht via the Oude Haarlemmersluis to the IJ. Exactly how the urban expansion took place could be investigated locally when in 2003 a few derelict buildings were demolished for new construction in the northern corner.

The Martelaarsbrug (bridge no. 29) ran over the Oude Haarlemmersluis, a lock that connected the two parts of the Nieuwendijk. The Spaarndammerbrug, a drawbridge, was at the Texelsche Kade (since 1879 Prins Hendrikkade). Both bridges disappeared when the canal was filled. The canal was filled in 1884, before Central Station was built, at the same time as the Nieuwezijds Voorburgwal.

In 1928 many buildings on the Martelaarsgracht acquired the status of a monument. This could not prevent some buildings being subject to speculation in the 1980s and 1990s and subsequently being squatted.

== Buildings ==
Some of the buildings were built in the stately Style Louis XIV from the early 18th century. A number of buildings have been designated as Rijksmonument s (national monuments).

The imposing building of the Koninklijke Hollandsche Lloyd on the corner with the Prins Hendrikkade was built in 1917–21 against the advice of the then Welstand Commission. The building on the opposite corner, with the advertising text "Kopje Koffie Karpershoek" on the cornice, dates from 1629. The café is said to be the oldest pub in Amsterdam. The Karpershoek started in 1606 as an inn on the IJ for the sailors of the Dutch East India Company (VOC). There is still silver sand on the floor of this brown café, as was used in the 17th century.

== Other Martelaarsgrachts ==
The Martelaarsgracht in Assendorp, Zwolle was filled in in 1923. Previously there was also a Martelaarsgracht in Bovenkerk near Amstelveen.

There is also a Martelaarsgracht in the city of Hoorn. This runs from the Pakhuisbrug to the Achterstraat (originally to the Gouw). The northern quay was renamed Onder de Boompjes in the 19th century.

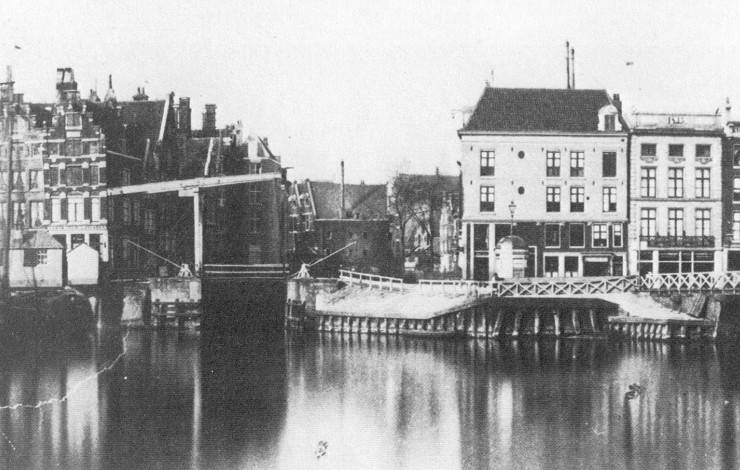
Open Havenfront and Prins Hendrikkade 25-32. In the middle the Spaarndammer bridge and behind it the Martelaarsgracht; before the infill in 1884.

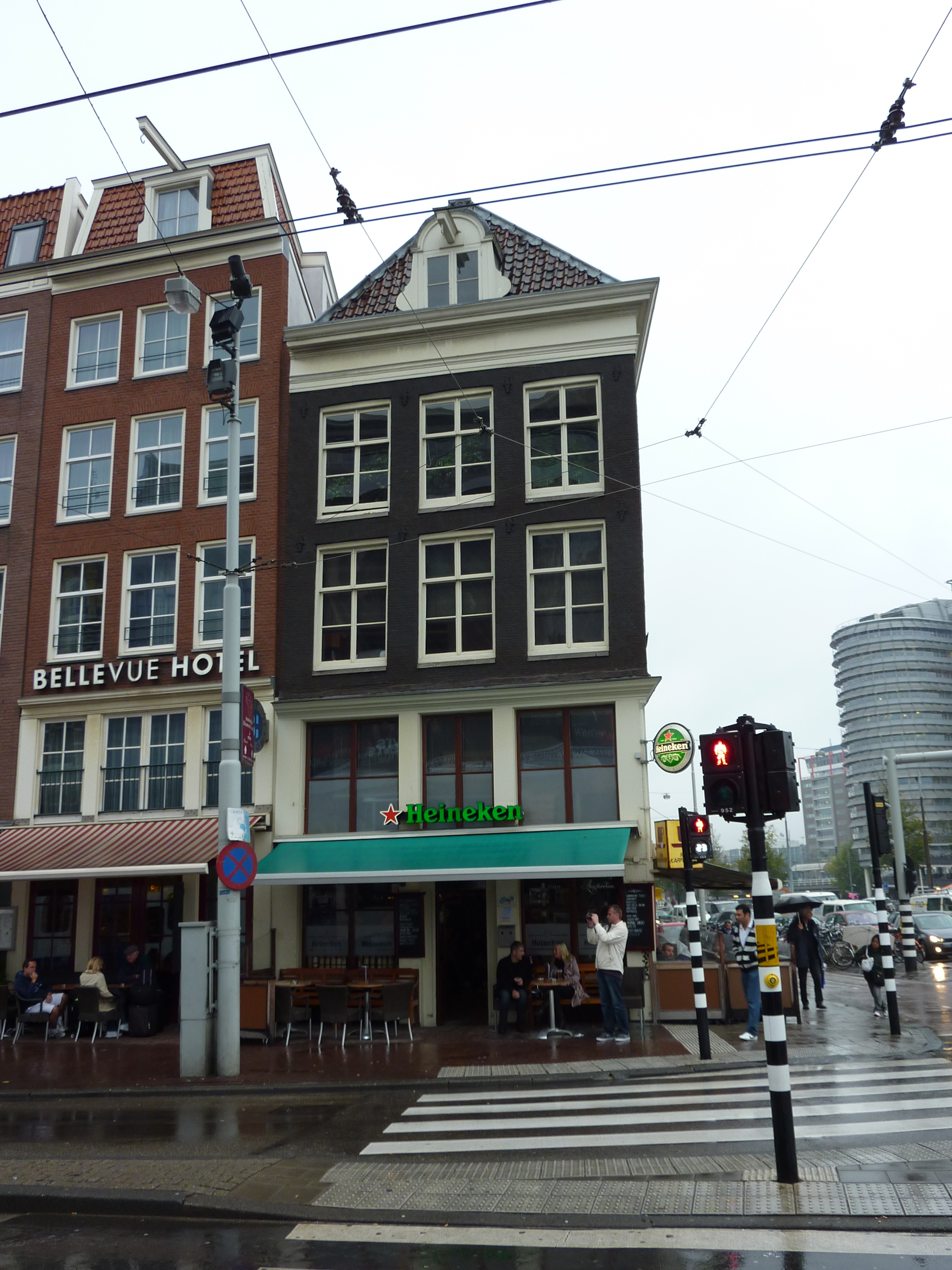
Café Karpershoek on the corner with the Prins Hendrikkade

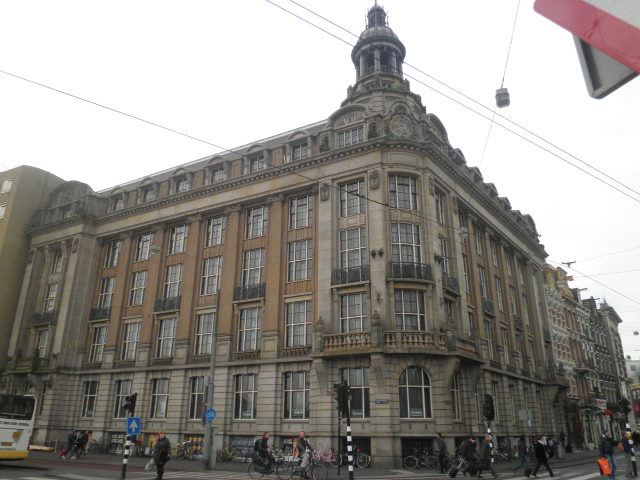
The imposing building of the Royal Hollandsche Lloyd on the corner with the Prins Hendrikkade
