= Scheepvaarthuis =

Building in Amsterdam, Netherlands

Coordinates: 52.3744°N 4.9041°E

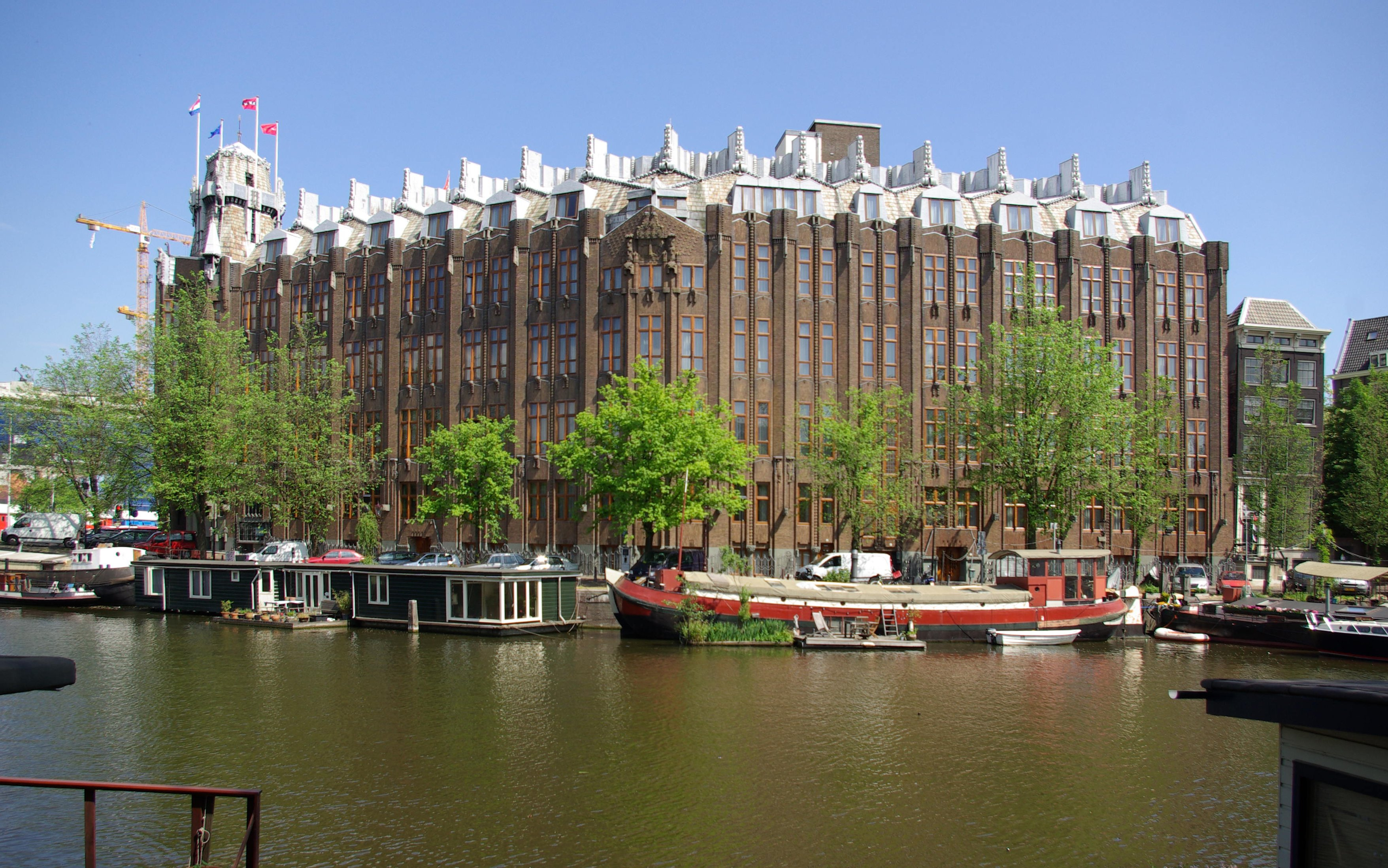
Amsterdam Scheepvaarthuis (2011)

The Shipping House (Dutch: Scheepvaarthuis) is a building on the western tip of the Waalseiland near Amsterdam harbour that is one of the top 100 Dutch heritage sites and generally regarded as the first true example of the Amsterdam School, a style characterised by "expressive dynamism, lavish ornamentation and colourful embellishments". It is situated on the Prins Hendrikkade and was erected on the spot where Cornelis Houtman's first trip to the East Indies had begun in 1595. The first part was built 1913 - 1916 (during World War I); the second part was built 1926 -1928. Originally, it was the headquarters of six leading Amsterdam shipping companies: the Netherlands Steamship Company (SMN), the Royal Packet Navigation Company (KPM), the Java-China-Japan Line (JCJL) and the Royal Dutch Steamboat Company (KNSM) with subsidiary New Rhine Navigation Company (NRM) and acquired in 1912 Royal West India Mail Service (KWIM).

== Design ==
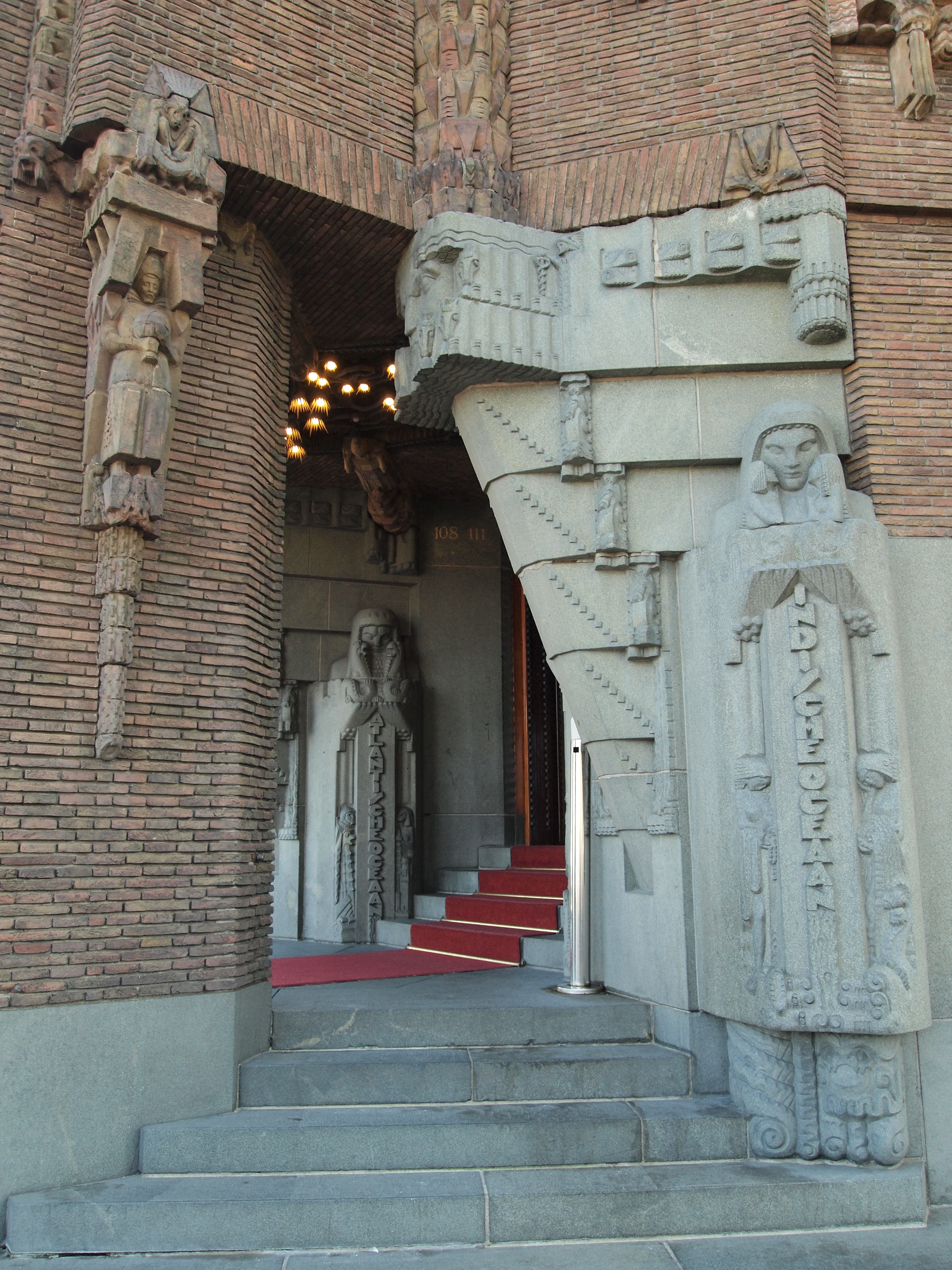
Sculptures at main entrance

A large group of artists participated in the extensive decoration of both the exterior and the interior of the building. The shipping companies housed inside were all involved in global trade, their combined lines "circumnavigated the earth in several directions" from Dutch hub points in the East and West Indies. As it was intended to serve as a practical, modern and functional office and also refer to the rich maritime tradition of the Netherlands, there are numerous maritime symbols incorporated into the design. For example, the outside of the building is covered in carving and relief sculptures that reflect the Dutch colonial empire, with the sculpted personifications of the oceans around the main entrance presented as "exotic mysterious women".

The building's design and execution were entrusted to the brothers Johan Godart and Adolf Daniel Nicholas van Gendt. The van Gendt brothers were responsible for the technical implementation and the design of the concrete frame. The architectural design was left to the then relatively unknown architect Johan van der Mey. The Amsterdam School architects Michel de Klerk and Piet Kramer also contributed.

The design has been described as still holding "the charm and brilliance" of the era.

== Construction ==
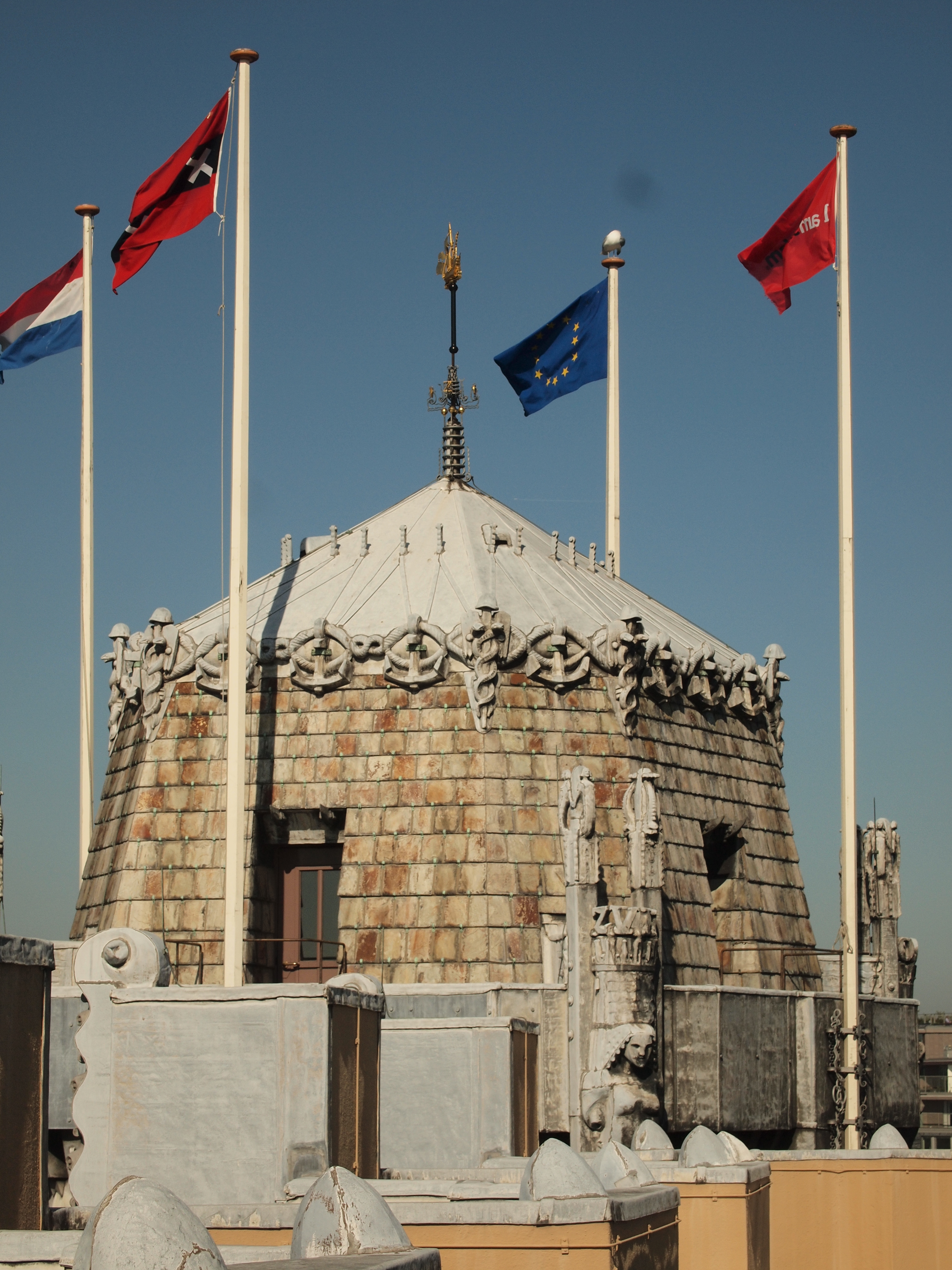
Shipping House tower

For the construction a public company was founded with a capital of 1,000,000 guilders. The building was planned to occupy 1,400 square metres at the corner of the Prins Hendrikkade and Binnenkant. Thirteen buildings had to be demolished: numbers 108 to 114 on Prins Hendrikkade and numbers 1 to 6 on Binnenkant. The first phase was 1913-16 and the expansion was completed twelve years later (1926–28). In order to avoid colour variation, the bricks were baked at the same time for both construction phases. Various types of brick, ironwork, stained glass, exotic hardwoods and textiles were processed in large quantities. The materials used were extremely costly with some types of brick and moulds for profiles being specially designed. Besides terracotta, much precious stone was also used, including granite, marble and varieties of porphyry diorite. The former main entrance on the corner Prins Hendrikkade and Binnenkant is topped by a truncated tower structure, coated with copper-coloured English slate. The lead eaves were executed in the form of ship ropes, golf, and fishing cups.

== Interior ==
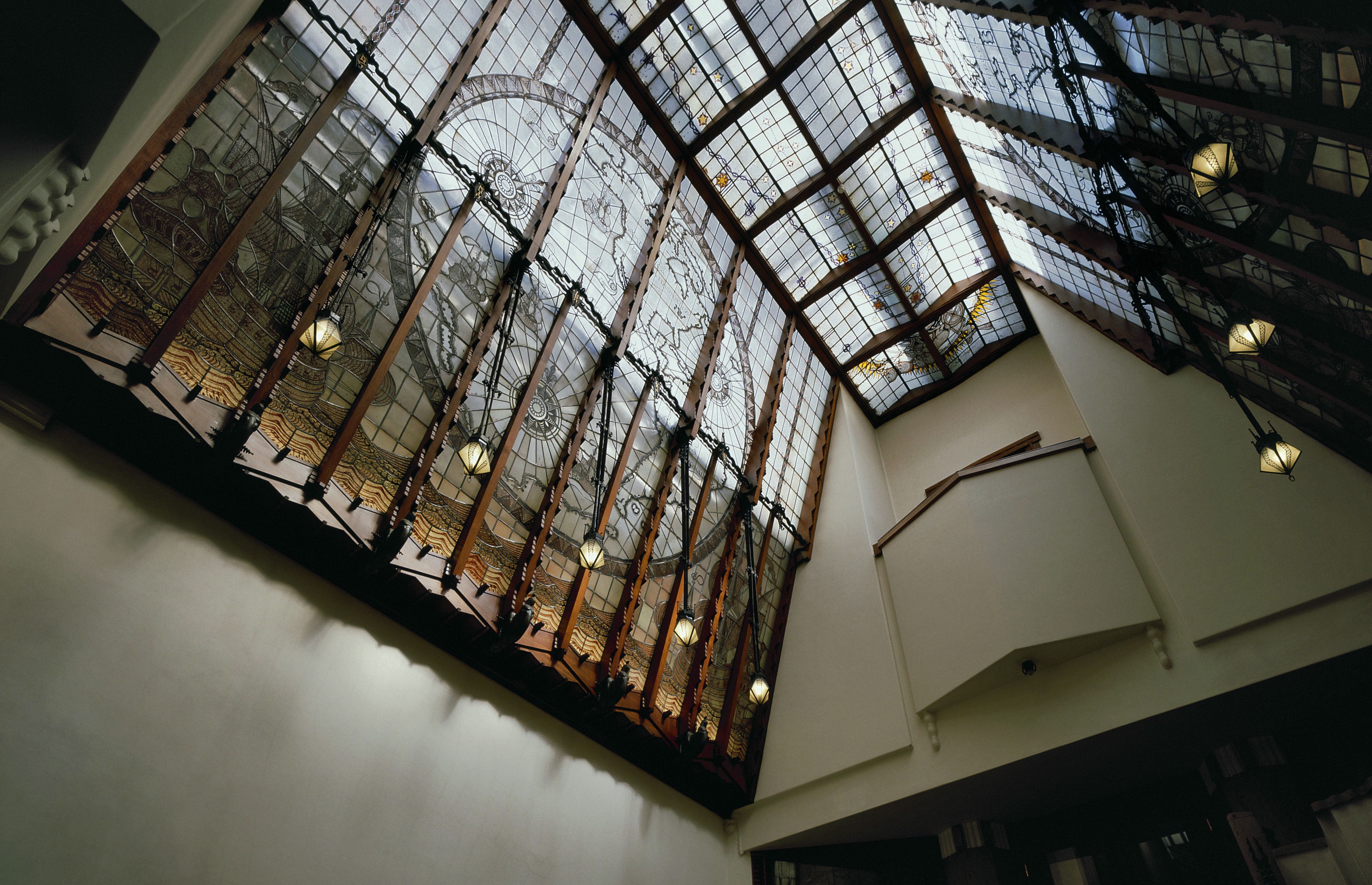
Enclosed stained-glass ceiling above the main staircase showing typical nautical themes.

=== Staircase ===
Several features of the building are particularly noteworthy: the richly decorated central staircase; the boardroom on the floors at the corner of the Prins Hendrikkade and the Binnenkant; and the large meeting room on the third floor on the Prins Hendrikkade side.

The ironwork in the central staircase forms a connecting link between the floors. The stairwell is enclosed by stained-glass, implemented and designed - as was almost all the other stained-glass work in the building - by the glazier William Bogtman.

The building contains a working paternoster lift.

=== Large meeting room ===
The large meeting or deliberation room on the third floor was by the interior designer T. Nieuwenhuis. Its interior fittings are made of dark tropical woods such as mahogany, ebony and coromandel. During a renovation in 1972 the stained-glass windows were shortened, original wall coverings were redone in a lighter shade and the original wall lamps, ceiling and chandelier removed. The original chandelier, executed in openwork brass, was replaced in 1974.

== Hotel ==
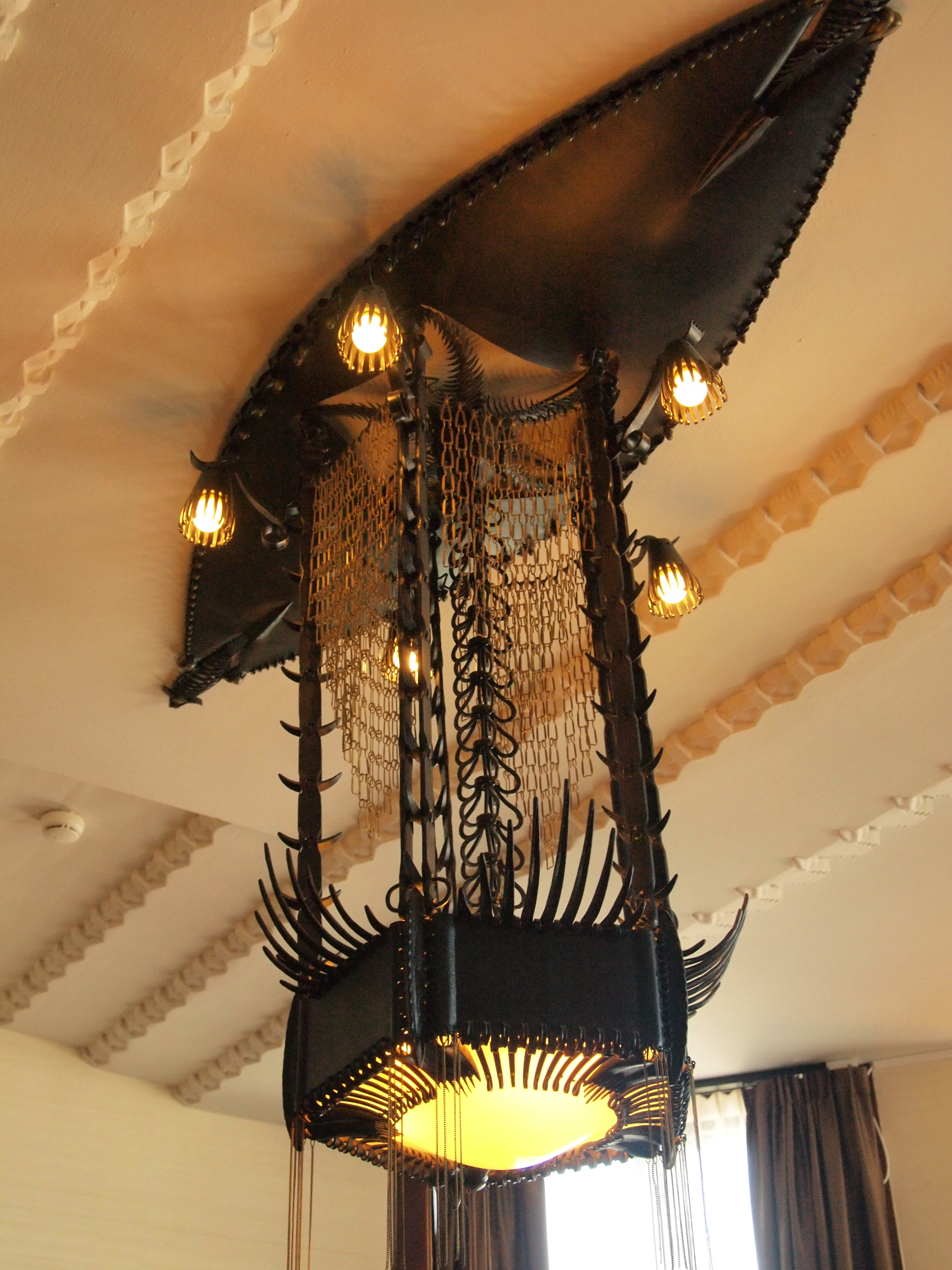
Chandelier

The last shipping company left the building in 1981 and the Shipping House was occupied in August 1983 by the Amsterdam Municipal Transport Company (GVB). By 2004, the GVB had gone elsewhere. After a major renovation, the building was opened on 8 June 2007 as a five star hotel/ restaurant/ conference centre containing 165 rooms, including 22 suites, eight banquet and meeting rooms, a restaurant, a bar/lounge and a wellness centre.

In designing the hotel interior, Amsterdam-based architect Ray Kentie was inspired by the original sumptuous Art Nouveau style. In keeping with the tradition of the Gesamtkunstwerk, he invited artists like Gerti Bierenbroodspot and Christie van der Haak to complete the renovation. Bierenbroodspot paintings and sculptures of shells, fish, mermaids and sea monsters can be viewed in all the rooms and corridors, and there are even hand painted Delft Blue dolphins on the bottom of the pool. Bierenbroodspot also designed the porcelain used in the restaurant. Christie van der Haak was inspired by Van Nieuwenhuis patterns in the designs for the decoration of the room interiors, the restaurant and the bar. The damask table napkins were hand woven in the workshops of the National Dutch Textile Museum.

== Timeline ==
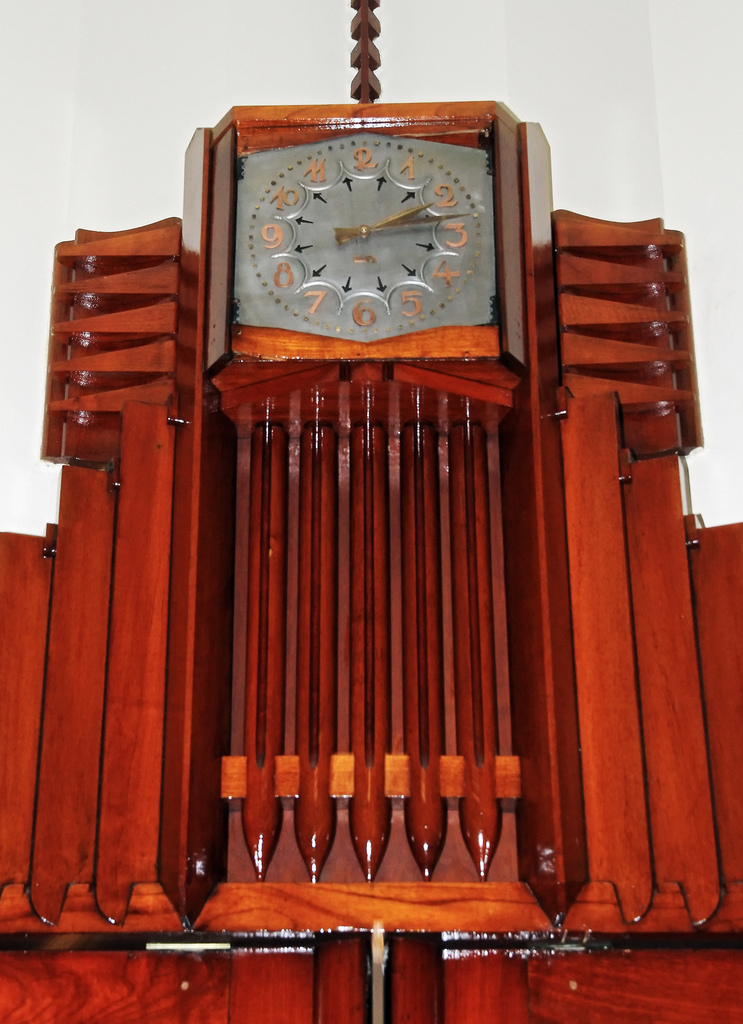
Shipping House clock

- 1912 Mission to Johan Melchior van der Mey for a design of the Shipping House, under the auspices of the Office The Shipping SA, whose shareholders are six leading Amsterdam shipping companies, including the Royal Netherlands Steamship Company and the Netherlands Steamship Company.
- 1913 Start of construction.
- 1914/1916 Opening of the first part with the users / owners of the six Amsterdam shipping companies.
- 1926/1928 Expansion resulting in opening the second part.
- 1942 The Shipping House is claimed on behalf of the German "Soziale Verwaltung" and company housing is limited to the third and fourth floor.
- 1945 The shipping companies return to their own floor and begin the restoration of their fleet.
- 1953 The companies consider a final completion of the building - a third wall to complete the triangle.
- 1972 The Shipping House listed as a national monument (Rijksmonument).
- 1979 The Shipping House is sold to Caransa, which in turn sells it in 1983 to the municipality for NLG 14,000,000.00.
- 1983 The Shipping House is used by the Municipal Transport Company of Amsterdam (GVB) as its headquarters.
- 1998 The Shipping House is owned by the Van Eijl family, including the owner and director of Amrâth Hotels & Restaurants. Meanwhile, the façade including ironwork, was restored in cooperation with the Bureau of Monument Care and Architecture led by Hoogevest Architects.
- 2005 Opening activities for the conversion to hotel.
- 2007 Opening Grand Hotel Amrâth Amsterdam.
