= Prins Hendrikkade =

Street in Amsterdam

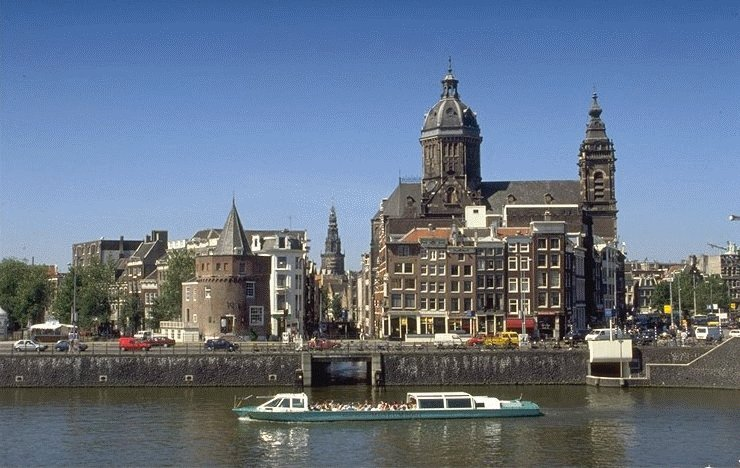
- Part of Prins Hendrikkade viewed from the north, with the Schreierstoren (left), the northern end of Geldersekade canal (centre), and the Basilica of Saint Nicholas (right)

- Location within Amsterdam
- Location: Amsterdam, Netherlands
- Postal code: 1011 AG-AW, 1011 TB-TD, 1011 VC, 1012 AC-AE, 1012 TK-TM
- Coordinates: 52°22′25″N 4°54′22″E
- West end: Singel canal, Haarlemmersluis
- East end: Kattenburgerplein

Prins Hendrikkade (Dutch for "Prince Henry's Quay") is a major street in the centre of Amsterdam. It passes Amsterdam Central Station, intersects the Damrak at the mouth of the Amstel river, and forms the southern end of the IJtunnel across the IJ bay. The street formed the northern edge and outer harbour of the city until the 19th century. It was named after Prince Henry of the Netherlands, youngest son of King William II, following Henry's death in 1879.

The Prins Hendrikkade runs roughly northwest to southeast, from the northern end of Singel canal to Kattenburgerplein square. Car traffic is banned from the part of the street directly in front of Amsterdam Central Station, between Martelaarsgracht and Damrak. The street continues in westerly direction as Nieuwe Westerdokstraat and Haarlemmerhouttuinen. At the eastern end, the street turns north at Kattenburgerplein and continues as Kattenburgerstraat. The body of water between Prins Hendrikkade and the train station is known as Open Havenfront and, further east, as Oosterdok.

Along the street are 99 buildings that have been listed as national monument (rijksmonument). Prominent buildings on the street include the Basilica of Saint Nicholas, the Schreierstoren, the Scheepvaarthuis, and Victoria Hotel. Along the eastern part of the street are a number of quays where houseboats are moored.

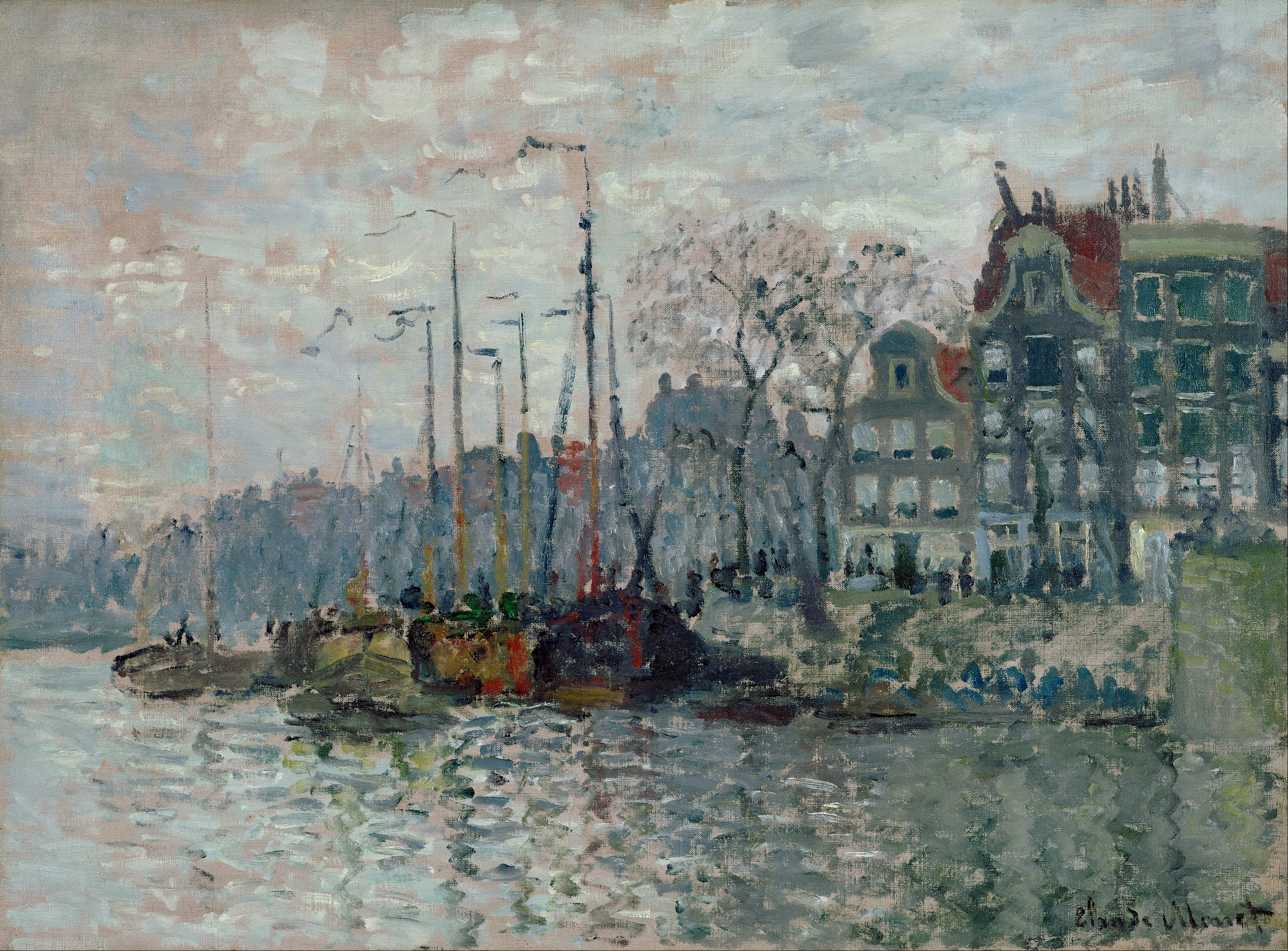
Claude Monet, View of the Prins Hendrikkade and the Kromme Waal in Amsterdam, 1874. Van Gogh Museum

Prins Hendrikkade has been depicted by various artists, including Claude Monet, who painted it in 1874.

== Public transport ==
Amsterdam Central Station, the city's main train station, is situated just north of the street. The Amsterdam Central Station stop of the Amsterdam Metro has an entrance on Prins Hendrikkade, just east of the Basilica of Saint Nicholas. A number of bus lines also have a stop at Prins Hendrikkade. Tram lines 4 and 14 traverse part of Prins Hendrikkade between Amsterdam Central Station and Dam Square, but do not stop on the street itself.

Canal tour boats (so-called rondvaartboten) are moored on Prins Hendrikkade near the station. Water taxis have a stop near the Scheepvaarthuis (Grand Hotel Amrâth).

== History ==
The Prins Hendrikkade originally formed the Open Havenfront, the northern edge and outer harbour of the city, along the IJ waterfront. This lasted until the 19th century, when Amsterdam Central Station was built on artificial islands north of Prins Hendrikkade.

=== Original streets ===
The street was named in 1879 after Prince Henry of the Netherlands (who died in that year), replacing a patchwork of existing street names, from west to east: Haringpakkerij, Tesselse Kade, Oude Teertuinen, Kamperhoofd and Buitenkant.

The westernmost section, between Haarlemmersluis (at the northern end of the Singel canal) and Martelaarsgracht, was originally known as Haringpakkerij because the area was used for the local herring industry. A defensive tower known as the Haringpakkerstoren stood here until it was demolished in the 19th century. East of the Haringpakkerij, the street was originally known as Tesselse Kade or Texelse Kade ("Texel Quay"). This narrow quay replaced an area that was used as timber yards (houttuinen) until the 17th century. After the artificial islands for Amsterdam Central Station were constructed in 1872–1879, the Tesselse Kade was broadened and renamed Prins Hendrikkade. A small park known as Prins Hendrikplantsoen was constructed on the now wide street, and a bust of Prince Henry was placed in the park (the bust was moved to the eastern part of Prins Hendrikkade in 1979). The terrain sloped down gently from the Prins Hendrikkade to a quay along the waterside. This quay was replaced in the 1960s with docks for canal tour boats operated by the company of J.H. Bergmann.

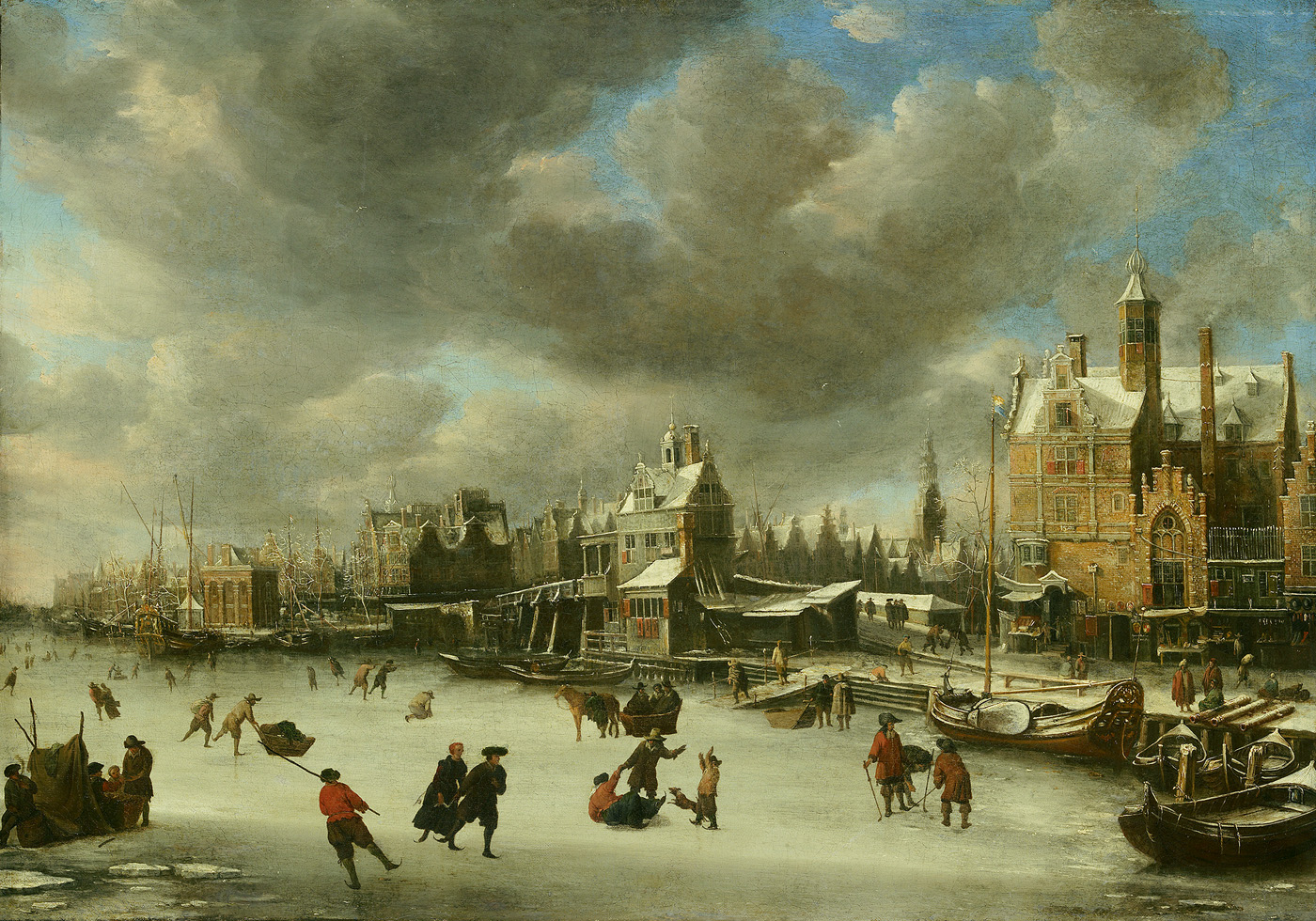
The Paalhuis and Nieuwe Brug, seen from the IJ, painted by Jan Abrahamsz Beerstraaten in 1663. Amsterdam Museum

At the intersection with the Damrak, where the Amstel river flows into the IJ bay, the Prins Hendrikkade runs across the river's mouth on the Nieuwe Brug ("new bridge"). The first bridge here was constructed in the late 13th or early 14th century. In 1560 the Paalhuis was built adjacent to the bridge to collect customs duties on shipping. This Renaissance building was demolished in the middle of the 17th century.

East of the Damrak, the street was originally known as Teertuinen ("tar yards") because the area was used to store tar. The storage of this highly flammable substance presented a serious fire hazard, so in 1664 the storage of tar was moved to newly constructed artificial islands known as the Westelijke Eilanden. Subsequently, the street continued to be known as the Oude Teertuinen ("former tar yards"). The section at the northern end of Oudezijds Kolk canal was known as Kamperhoofd. A large cannon was placed on the city walls at Kamperhoofd, which formed the northernmost point of the medieval city.

The easternmost part of the street was originally known as Buitenkant ("outside"), a name reflected in the street name Binnenkant ("inside") which still exists opposite this section of the street.

=== 21st-century modernisation ===
In 2018, the part of the street directly in front of Amsterdam Central Station, between Martelaarsgracht and Damrak, was made car-free in an effort to reduce east–west car traffic through the city centre and simplify the often chaotic traffic situation in front of the station. East–west traffic is since led along the northern side of the station.

The city government announced plans to modernise the eastern part of Prins Hendrikkade in order to make the area safer for pedestrian and bicycle traffic. The project was expected to start in 2023.

== Trivia ==
- Jazz musician Chet Baker died in 1988 after having apparently fallen out of the window of his room in Hotel Prins Hendrik at Prins Hendrikkade 53.
- Pink Floyd played on several occasions at Club Fantasio, then housed at number 142.
- Naval fleet commander admiral Michiel de Ruyter lived from 1654 to 1676 at number 131.

== Gallery ==
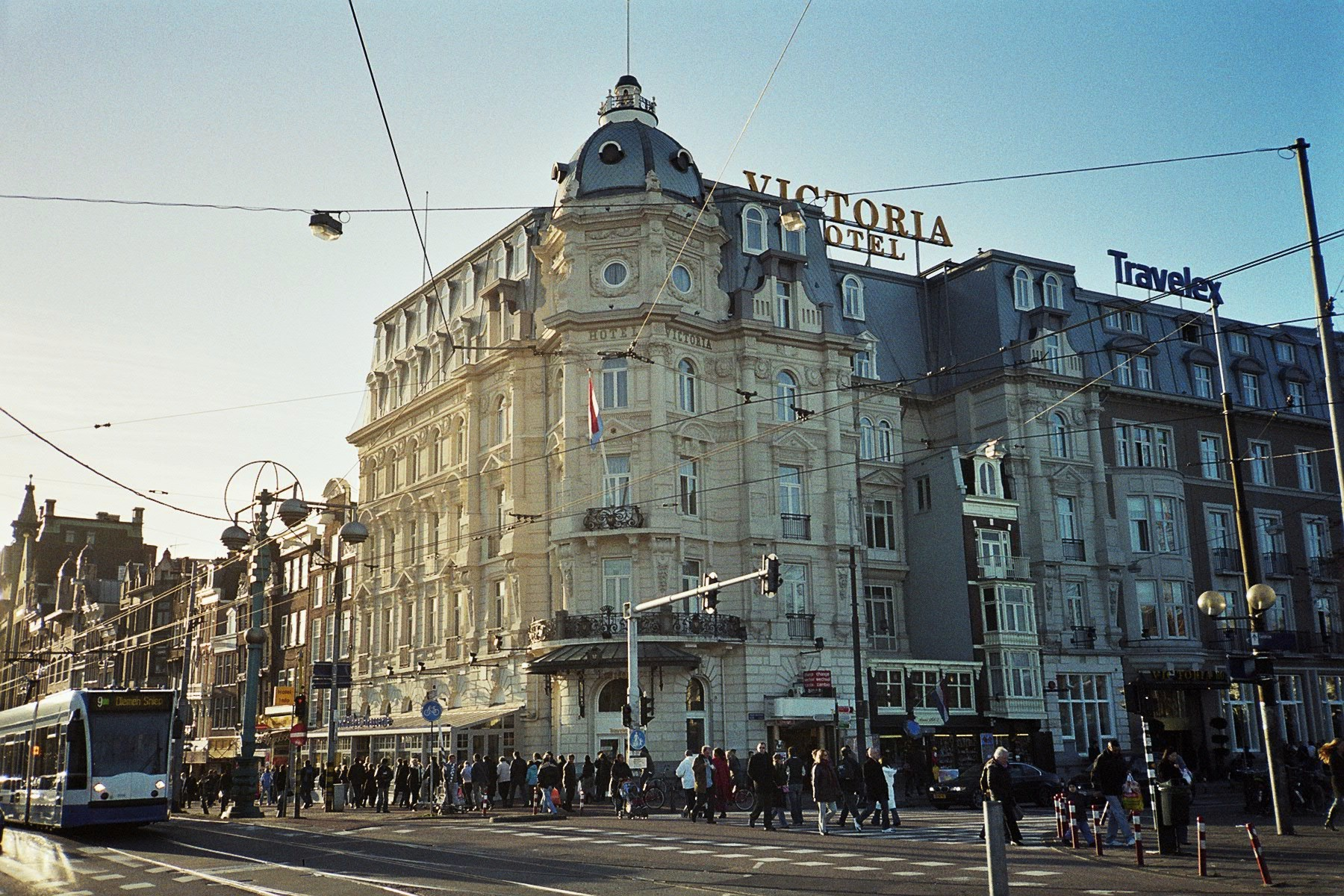
Victoria Hotel on the corner with Damrak

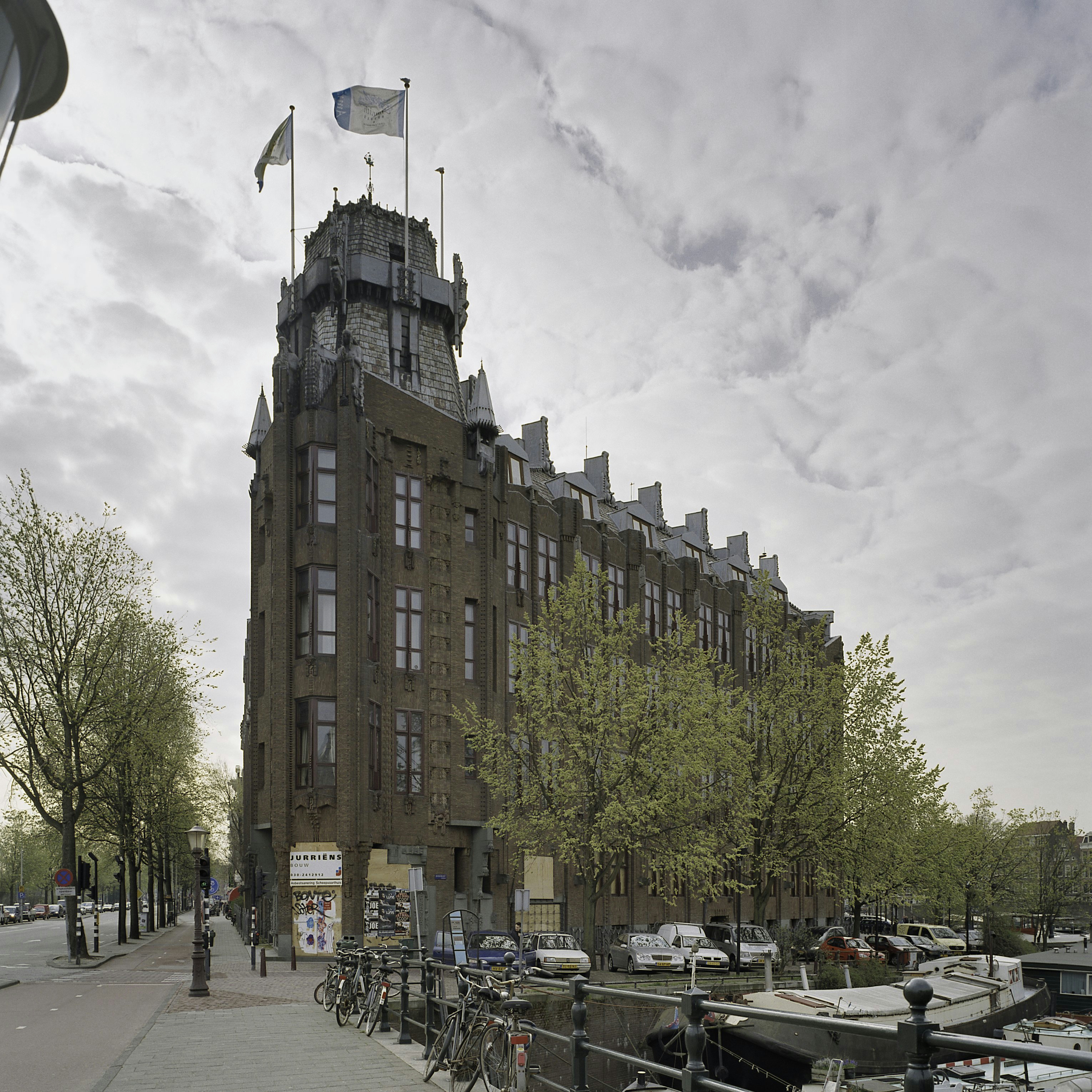
The Scheepvaarthuis seen from Prins Hendrikkade

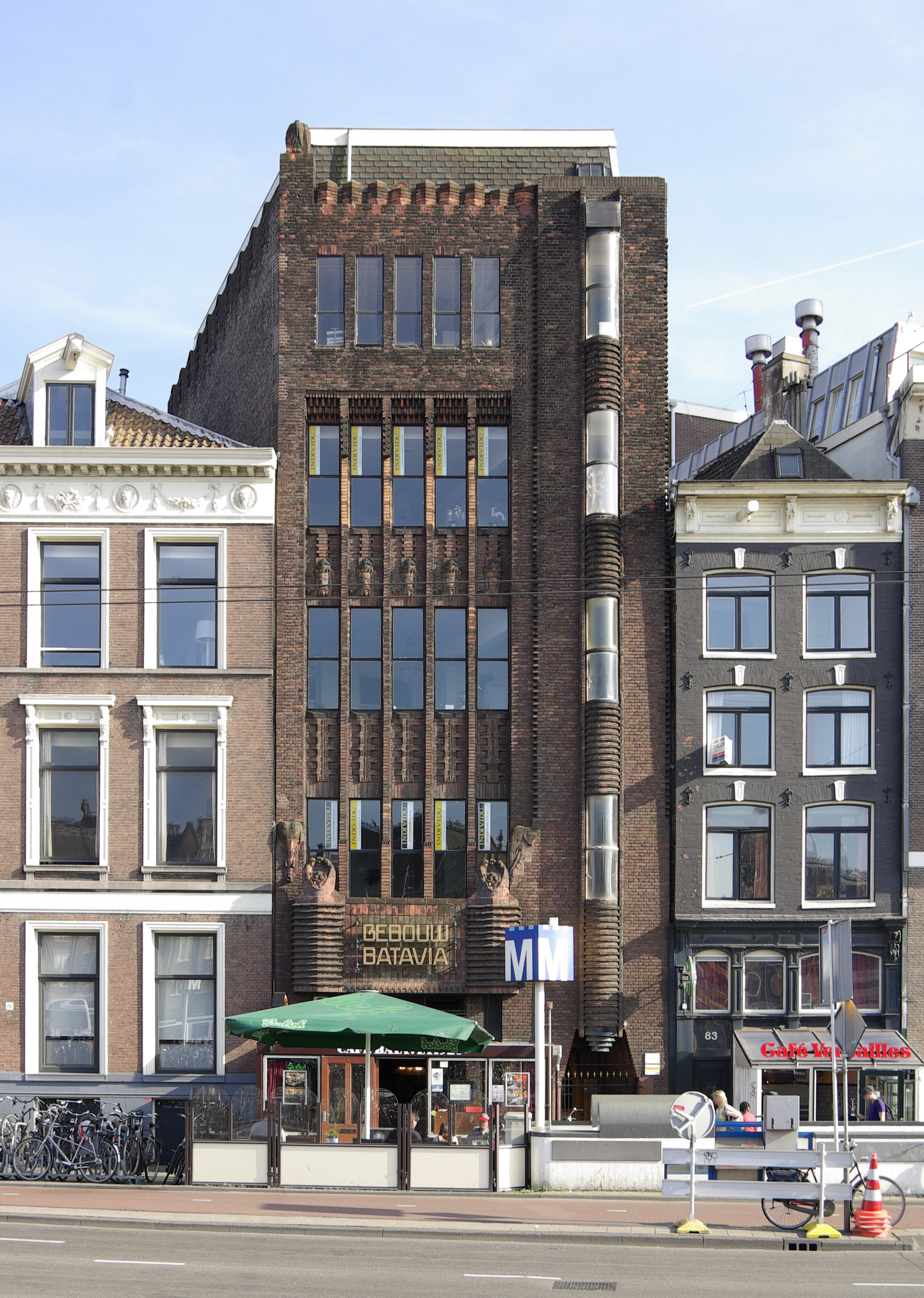
Gebouw Batavia, Prins Hendrikkade 84-85

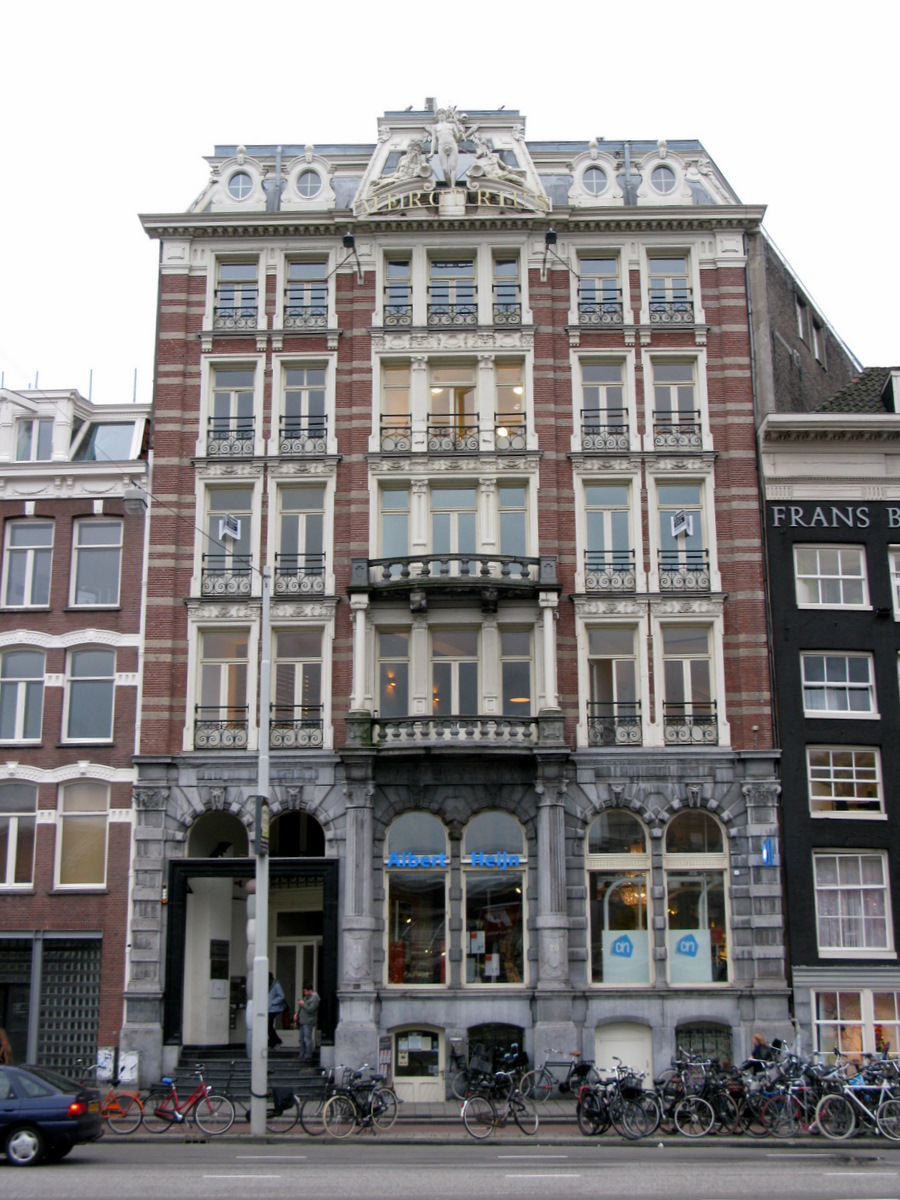
Gebouw Mercurius, Prins Hendrikkade 20-21

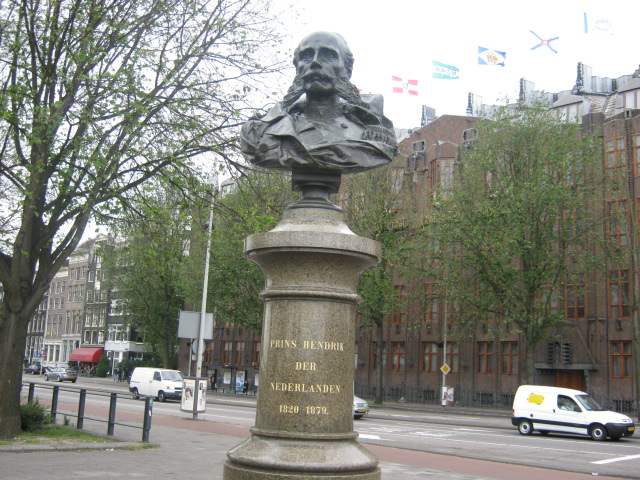
Bust of Prince Henry of the Netherlands

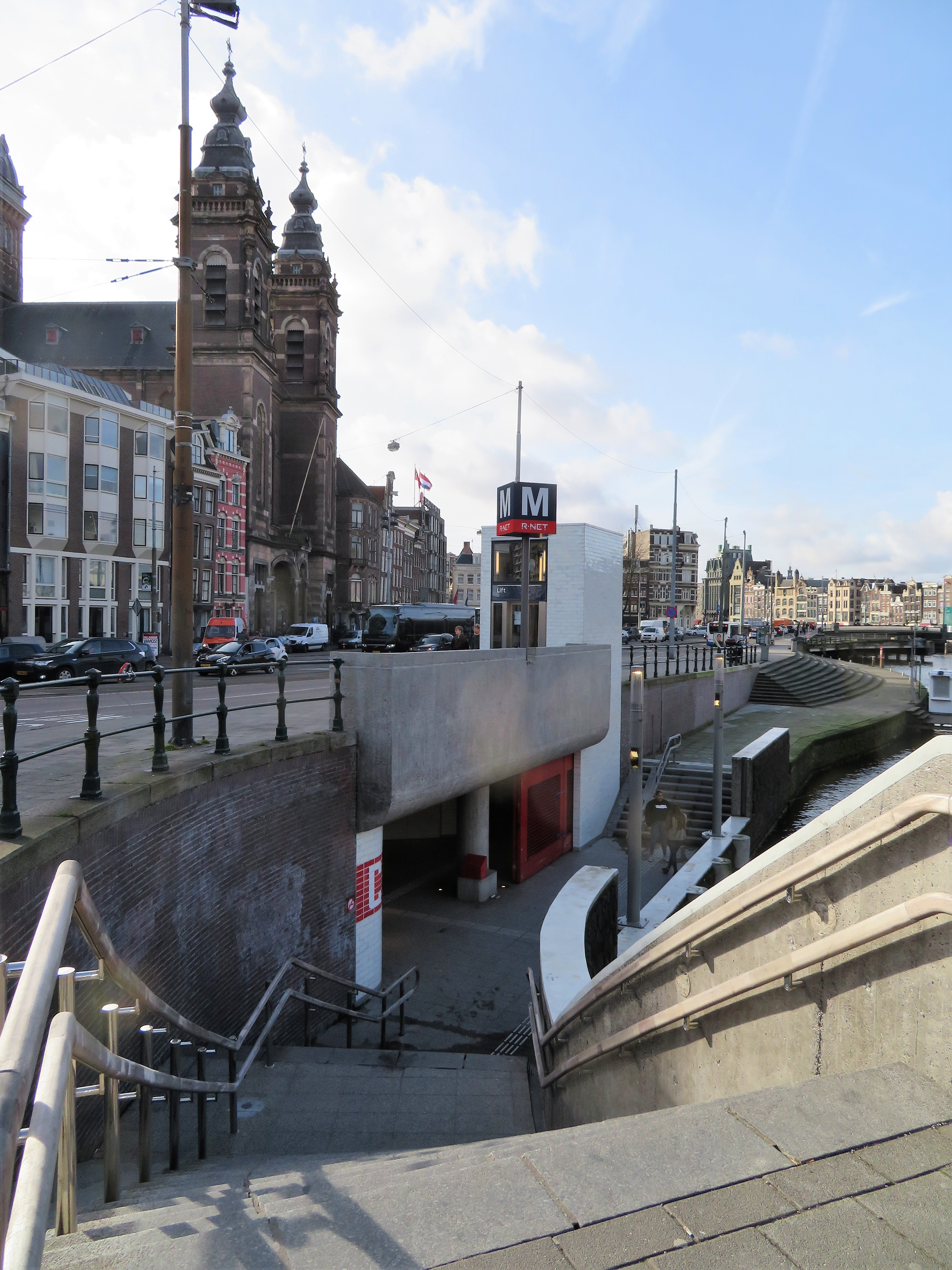
Entrance to the Amsterdam Metro

== See also ==
- Land register building (Amsterdam)
