= Schreierstoren =

Tower in Amsterdam, the Netherlands

- Schreierstoren
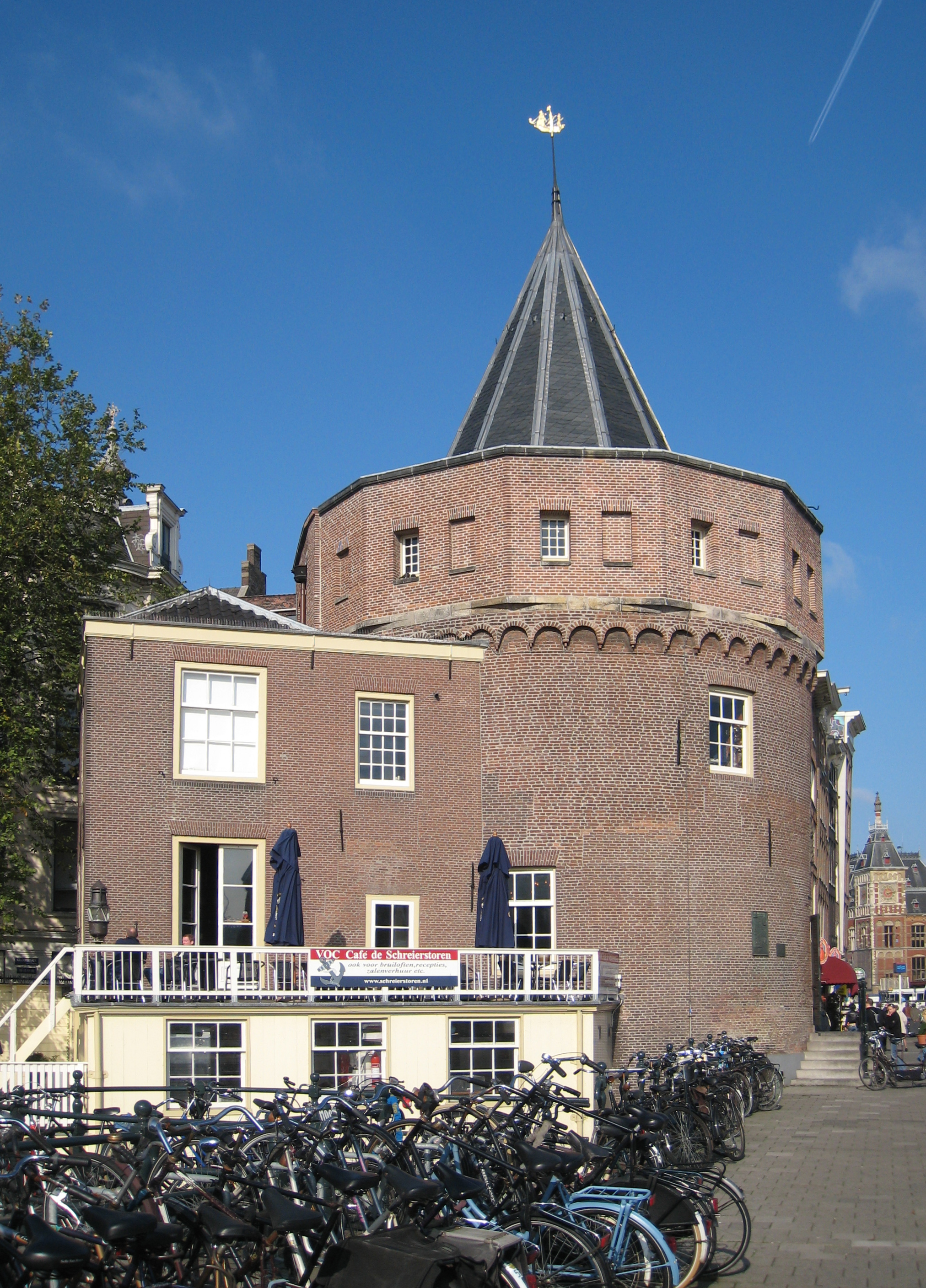

- Location within Amsterdam

General information
- Type: Rijksmonument
- Location: Amsterdam, Prins Hendrikkade 94; 1012 AE, Netherlands
- Coordinates: 52°22′35″N 4°54′08″E
- Completed: 1487

The Schreierstoren (English incorrectly translated as: Weeper's Tower or Tower of Tears), originally part of the medieval city wall of Amsterdam, the Netherlands, was built in the 15th century. It is located at the Prins Hendrikkade 94 in the city center of Amsterdam. It was the location from which Henry Hudson set sail on his journey to Northern America. This expedition would lead to the discovery of the modern New York metropolitan area, which laid the foundation for Dutch colonization of the region. It was built as a defense tower in 1487. It is currently a café and nautical bookstore.

== Etymology ==
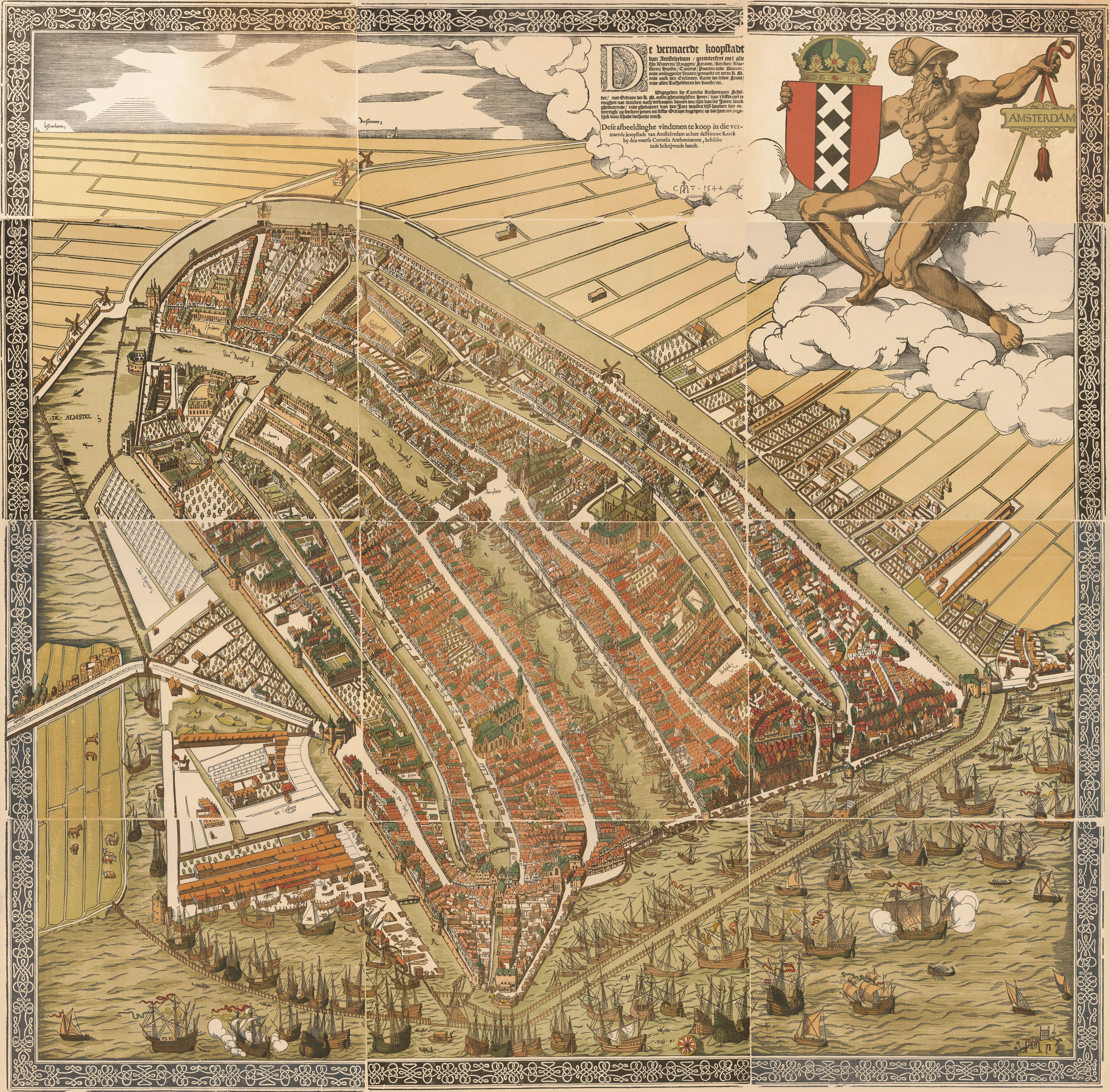
The Big Map of Amsterdam in 1544 by Cornelis Anthonisz. Depicting the sharp angle the Schreierstoren makes with the old city wall on the bottom-left.

The name in Old Dutch was 'Schreyhoeckstoren' (schrey = sharp, hoeck = angle, toren = tower) referring to the sharp angle the tower makes in the once-connected city walls. Later the name began to be shortened to the Schreierstoren.

Schreierstoren is incorrectly known for the fact that women wept there for their husbands, who would leave from that port, to go to war, the colonies or to fish. Most of the weeping that was done was for the fishermen who left from that port. However, this is an incorrect myth based on the confusion of the similarities of the Old Dutch word schrey meaning "sharp" and the Dutch word schreien meaning "weeping". This confusion was further supported by the "memory tablet" in the tower, dating back to 1569, which "commemorates" a woman who was so "heart-grieved" at the departure of her husband, that she went insane. Another factor that led to the confusion was that the old city wall is demolished and the tower does not make a visible sharp corner anymore.

== Gallery ==
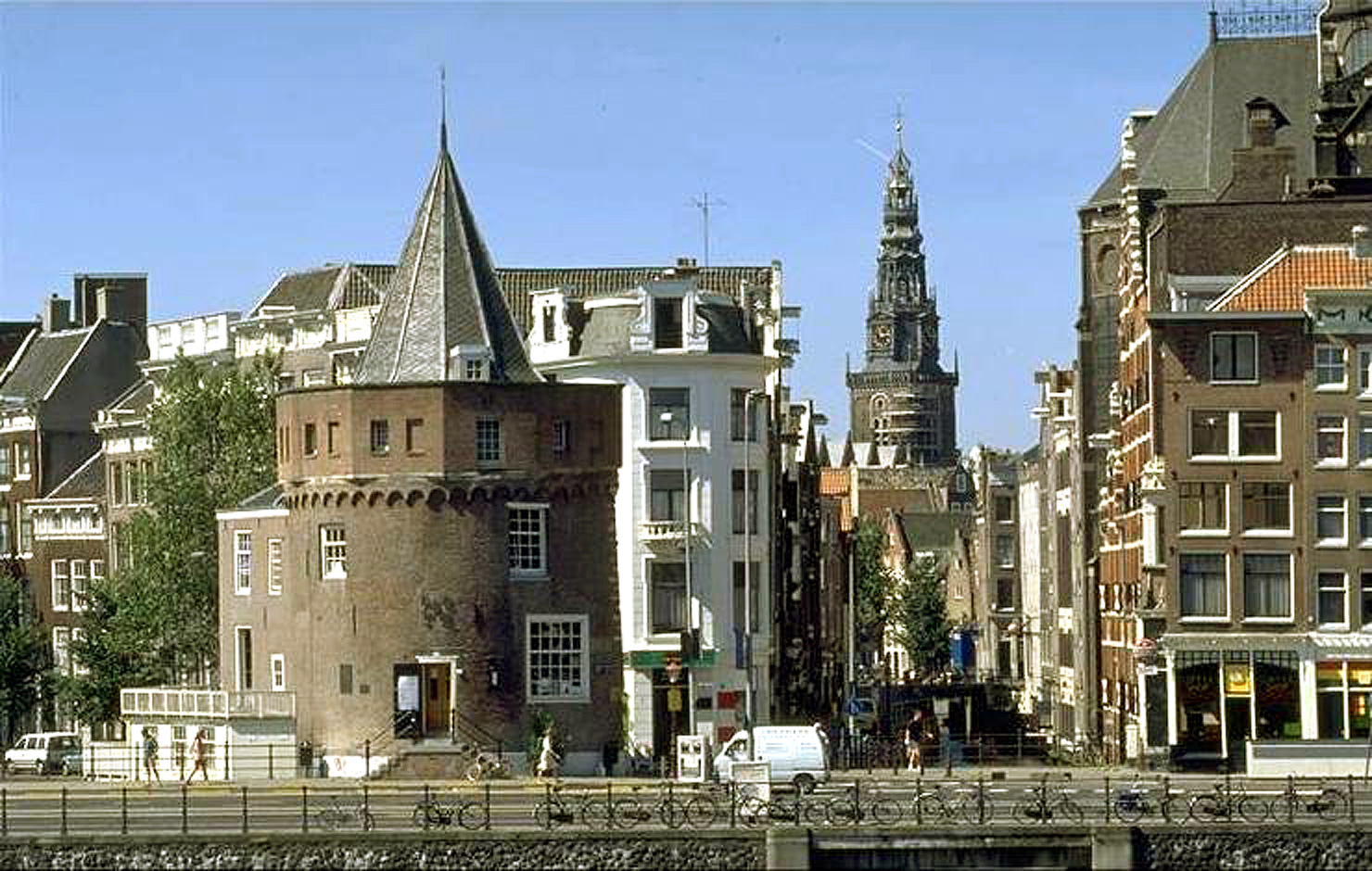
The Schreierstoren as seen from the Oosterdok with in the background the Oude Kerkstoren.

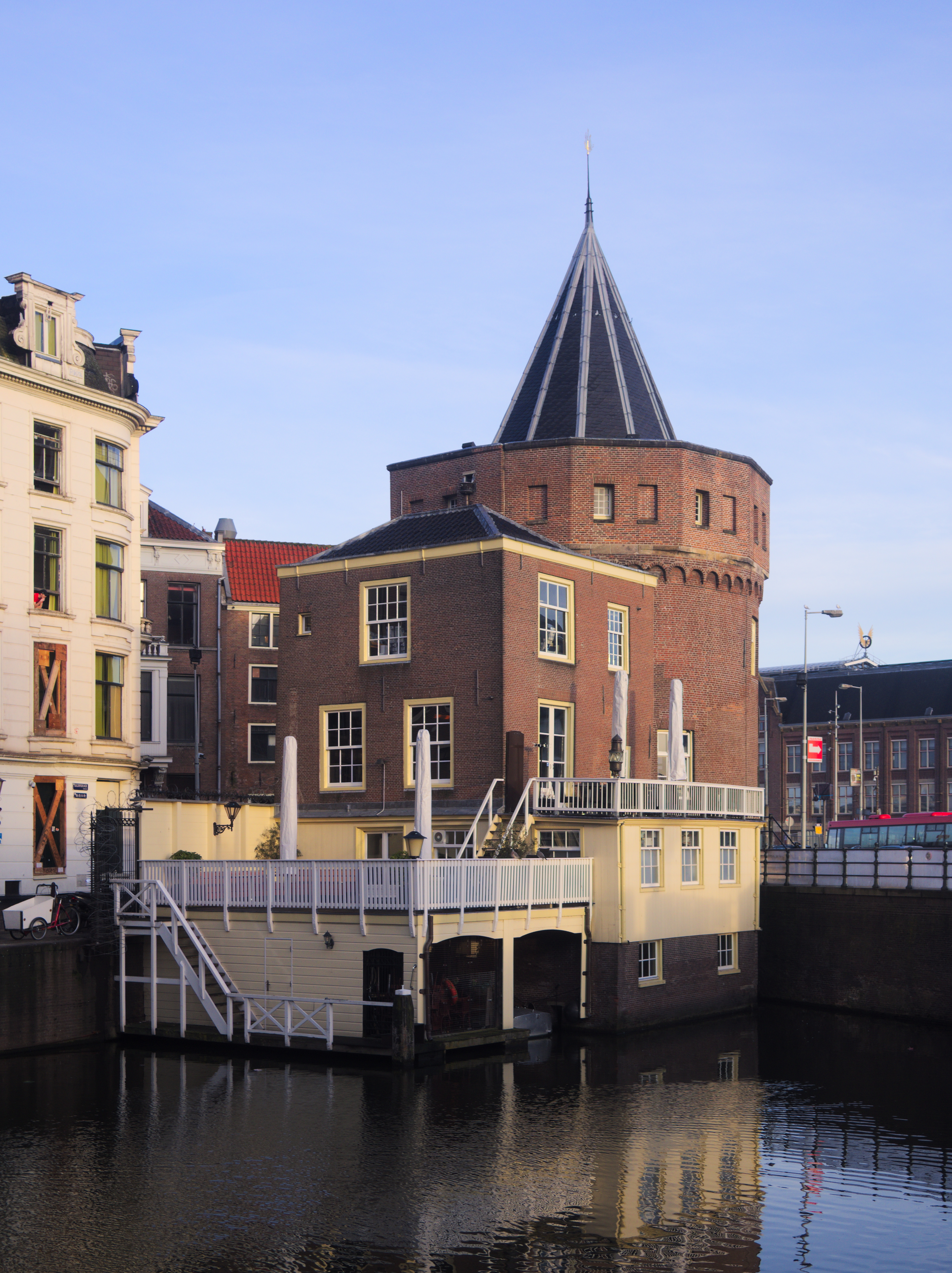
Schreierstoren.

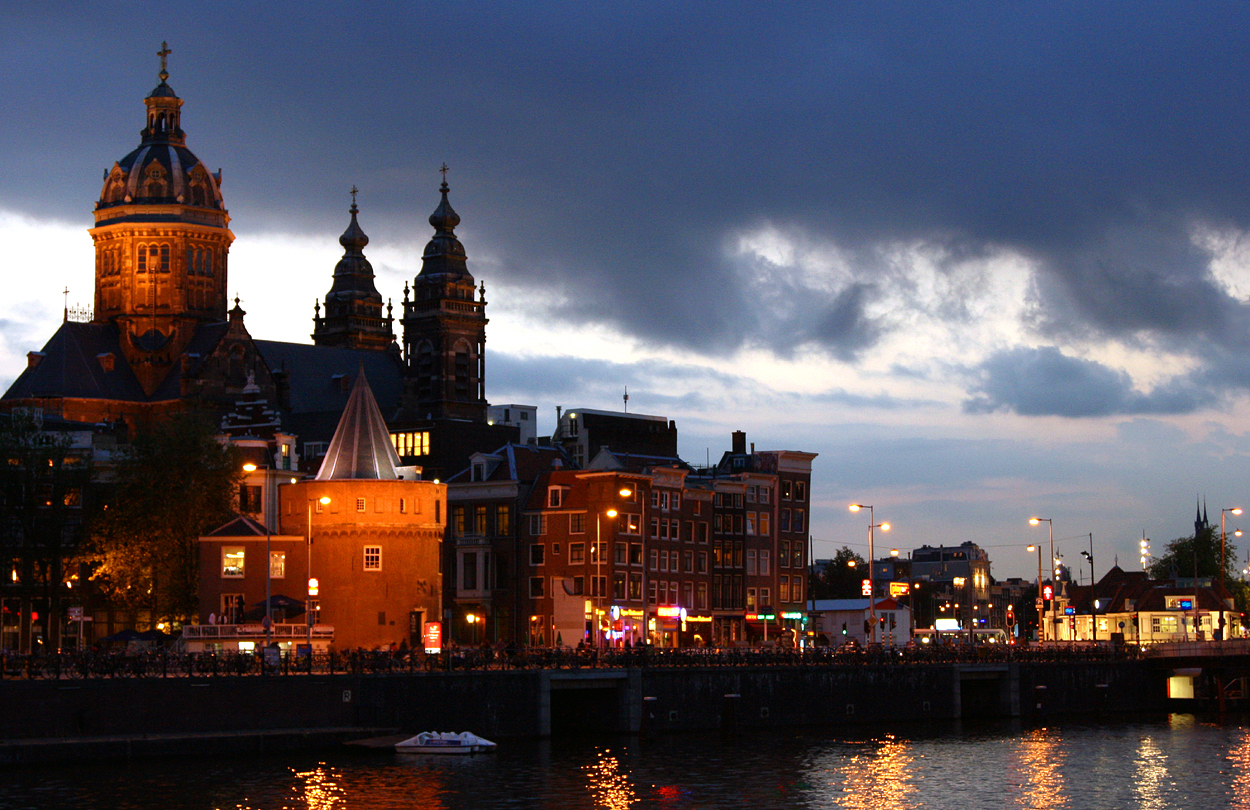
Schreierstoren at dusk.

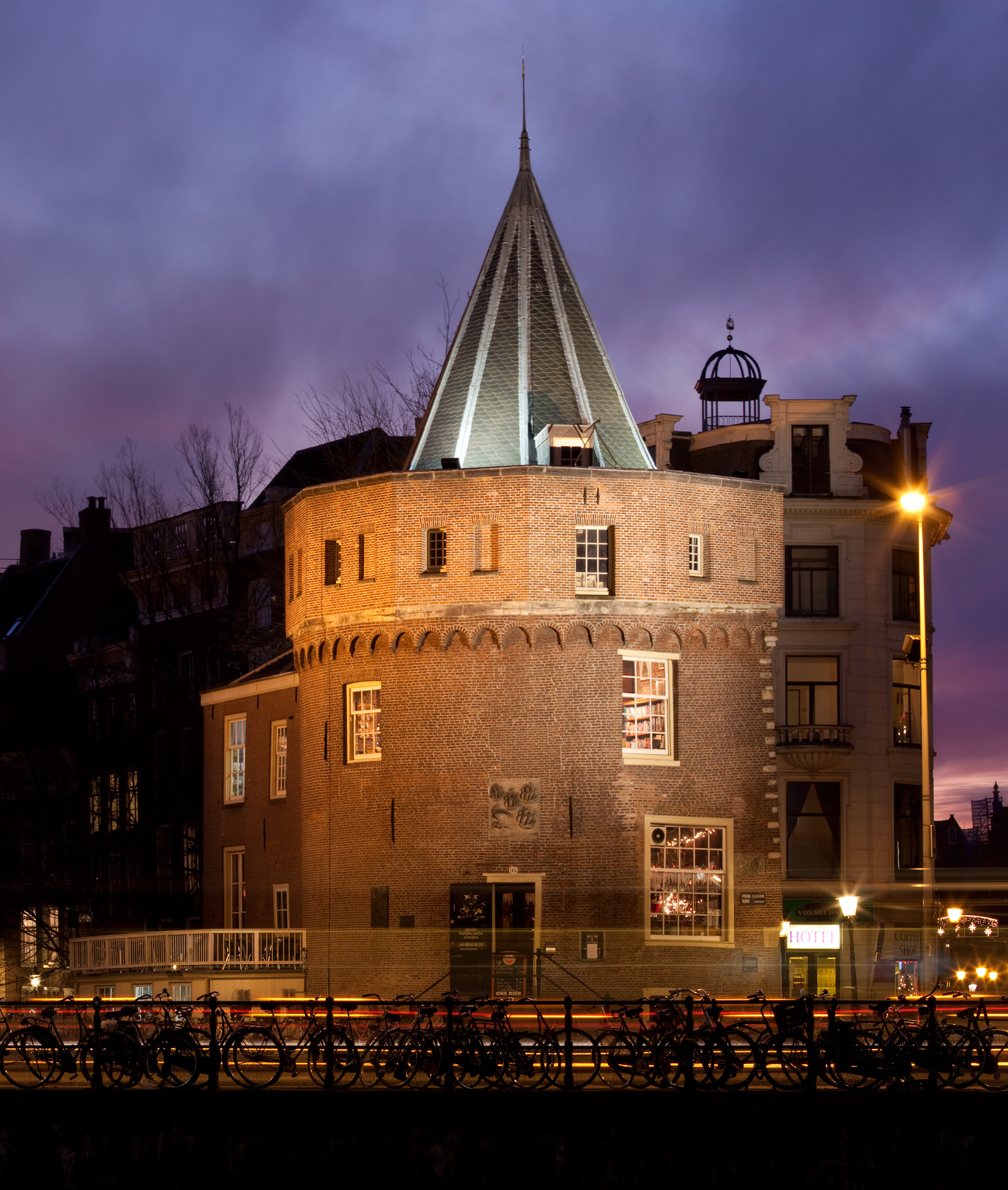
Schreierstoren at dusk close-up.

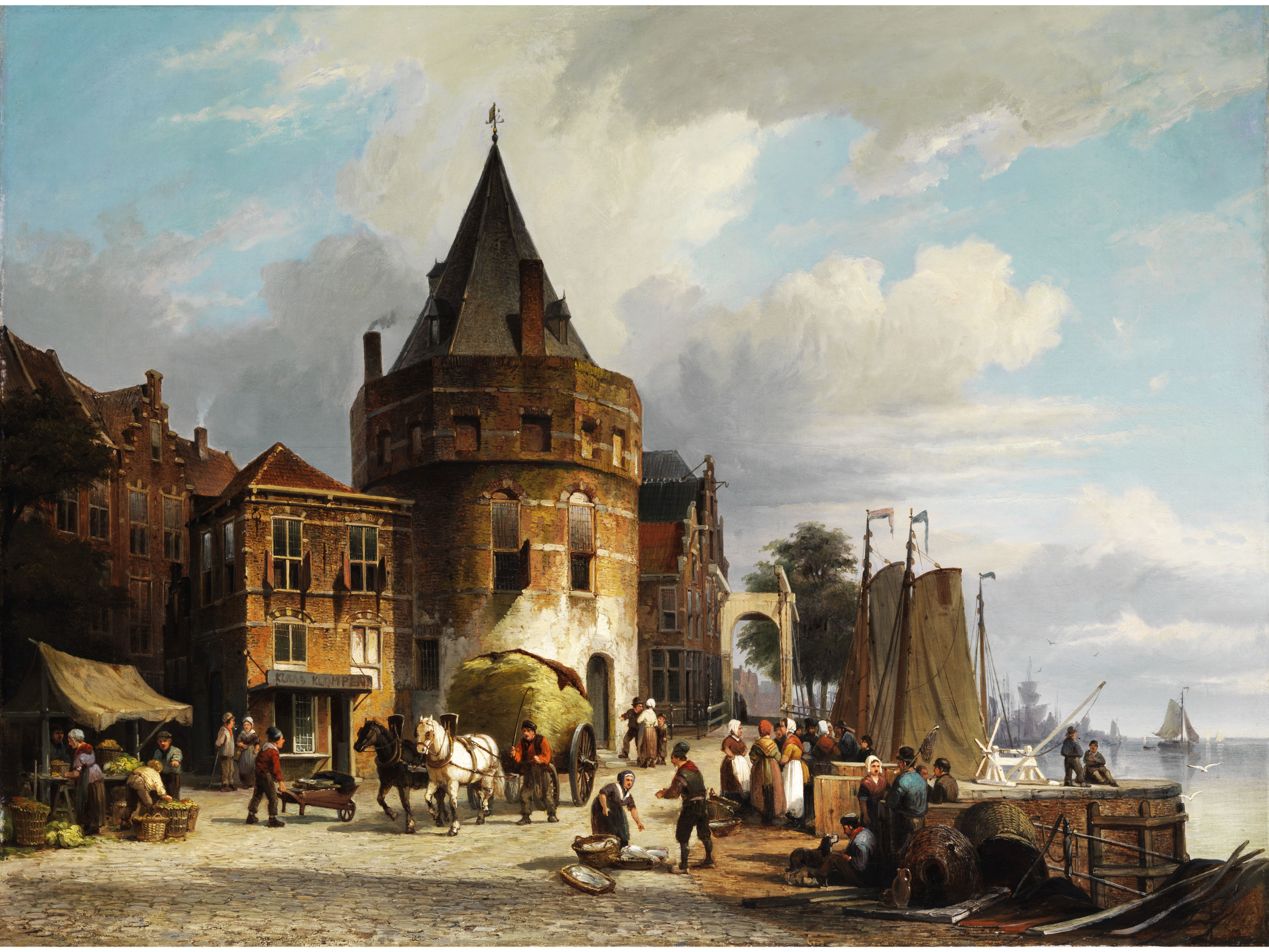
Scheierstoren in the 19th century, by Willem Koekkoek.

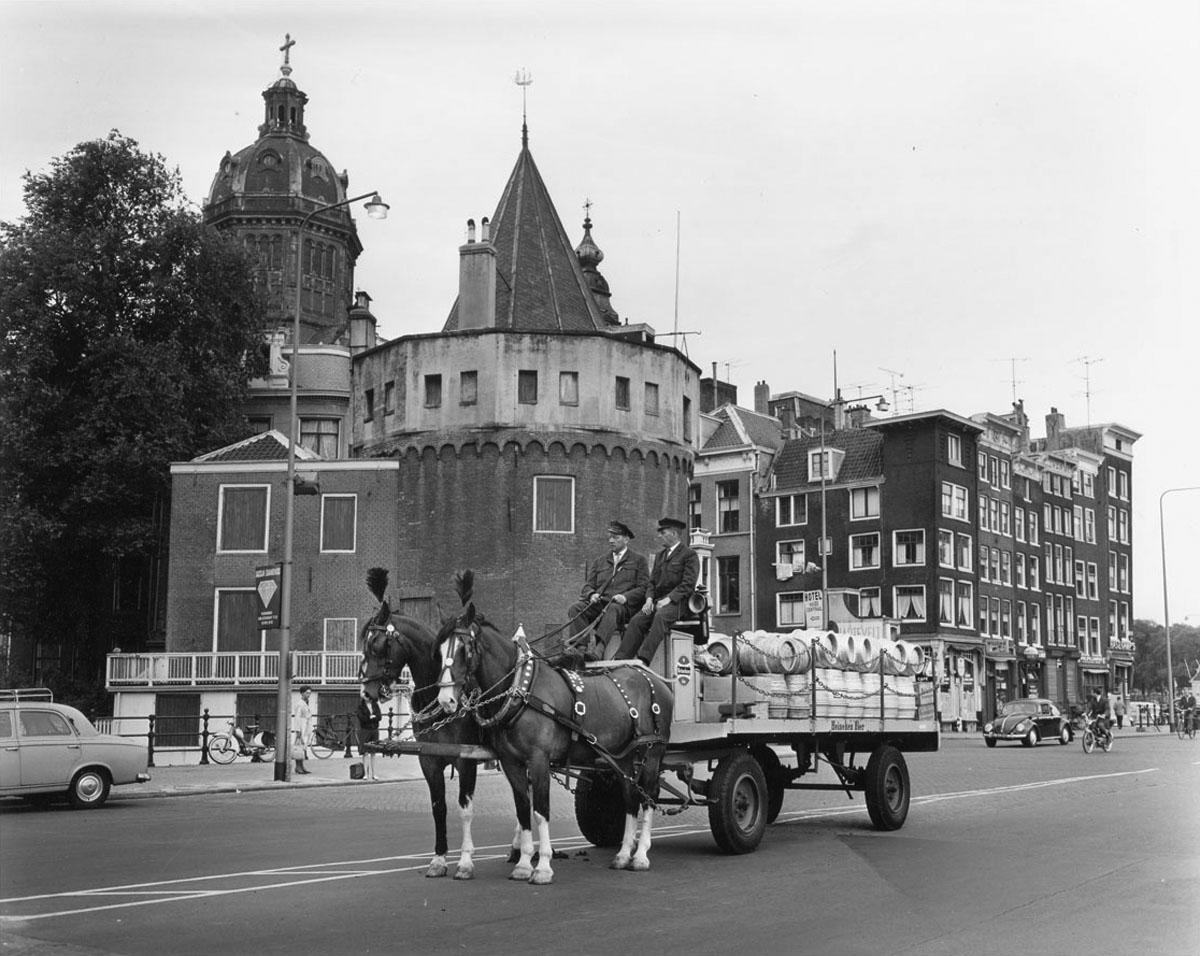
Schreierstoren in 1965.

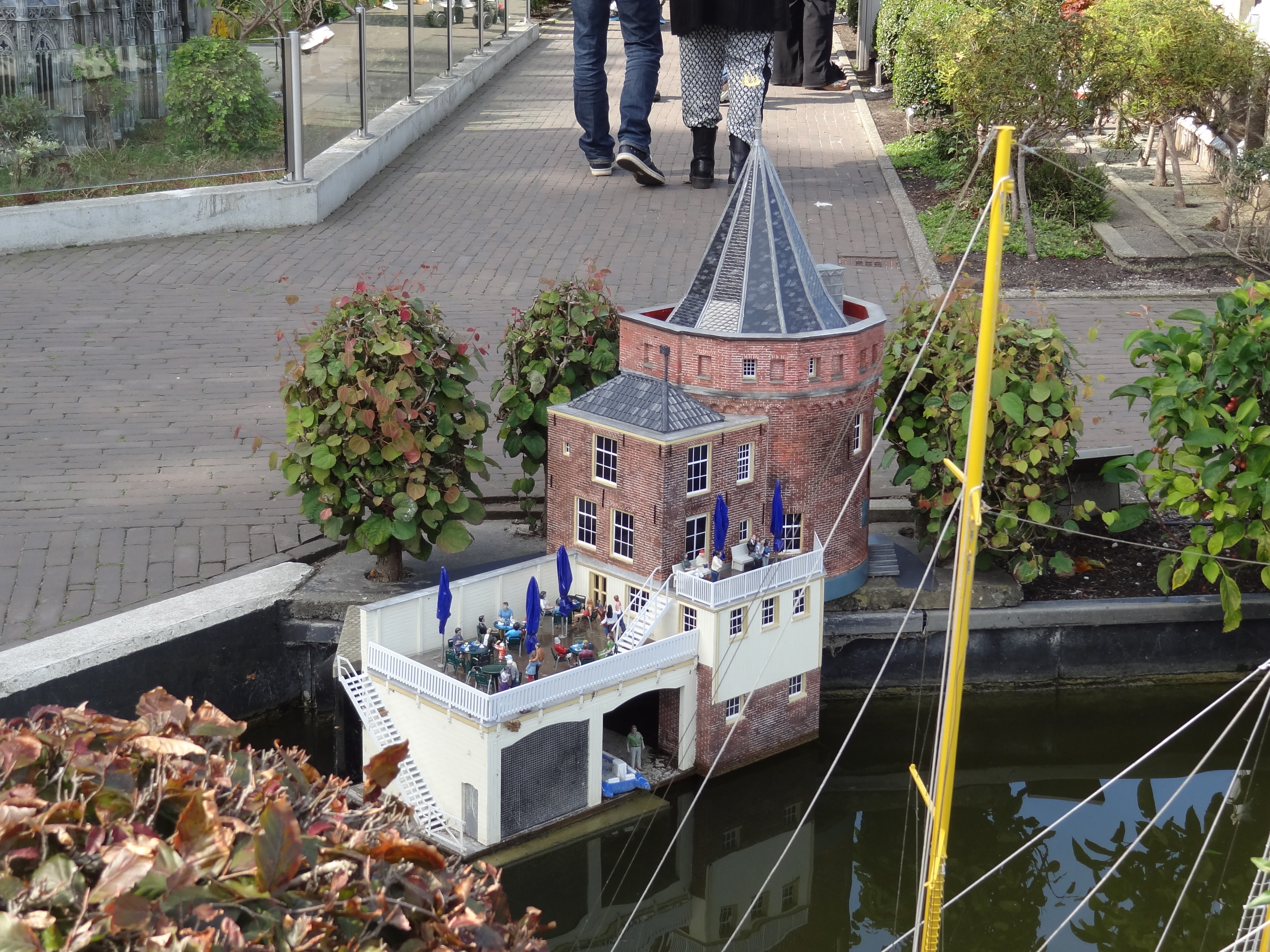
Miniature version of the Schreierstoren in Madurodam (The Hague).

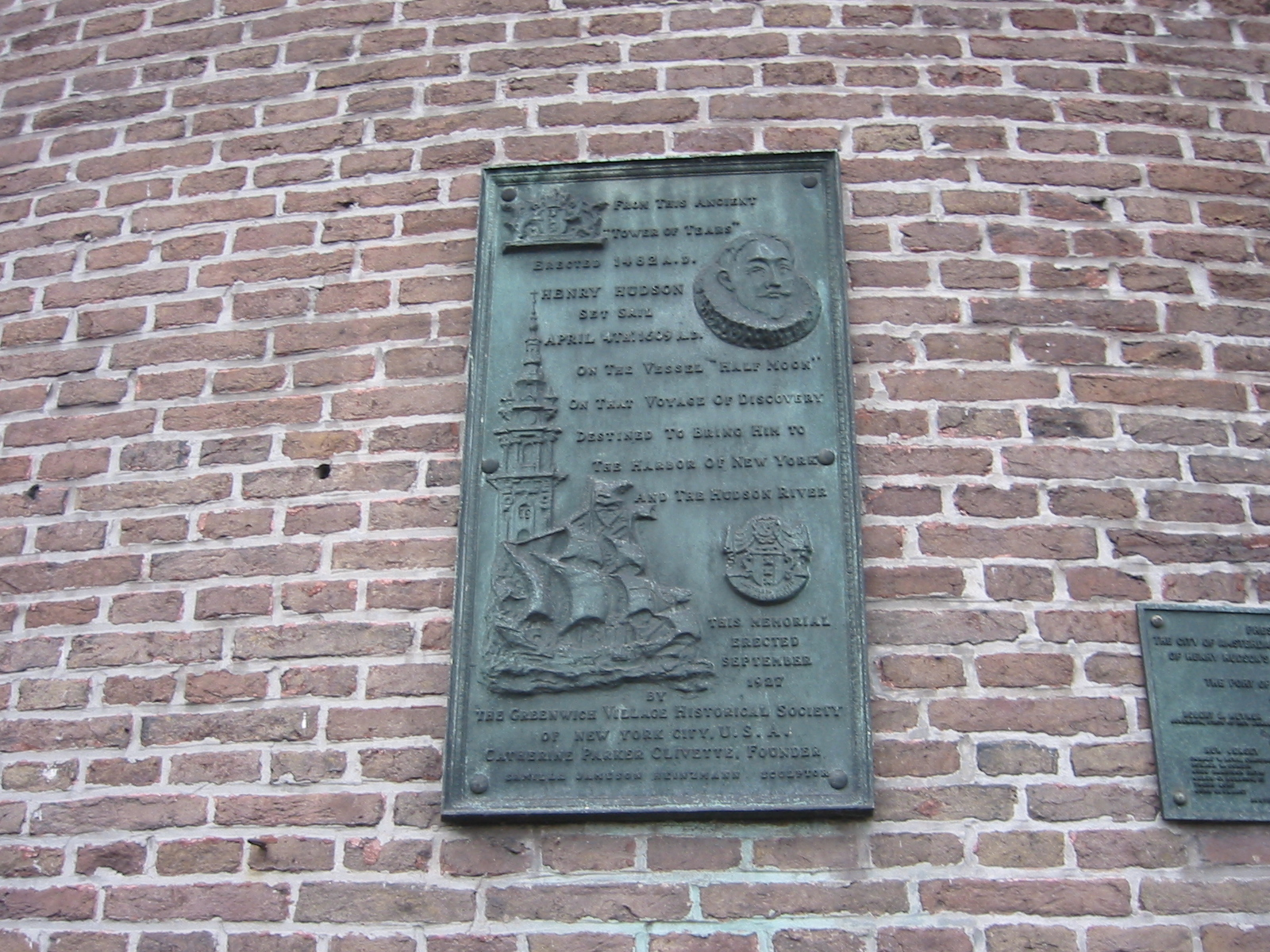
Memory tablet of the Henry Hudson expedition.

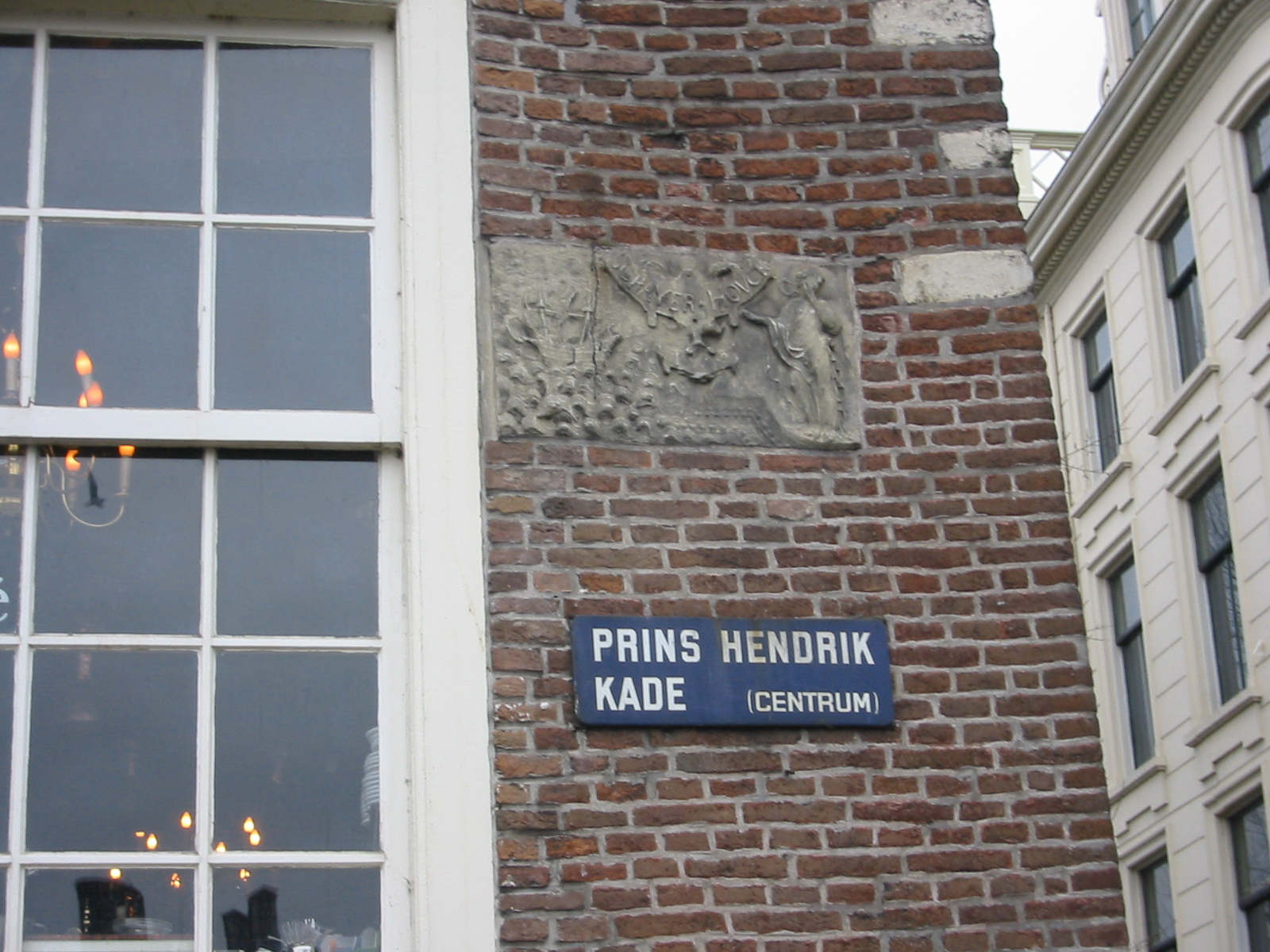
Above the street name sign 'Prins Hendrikkade' is a tablet with the old name: 'Scrayer-Houck'.

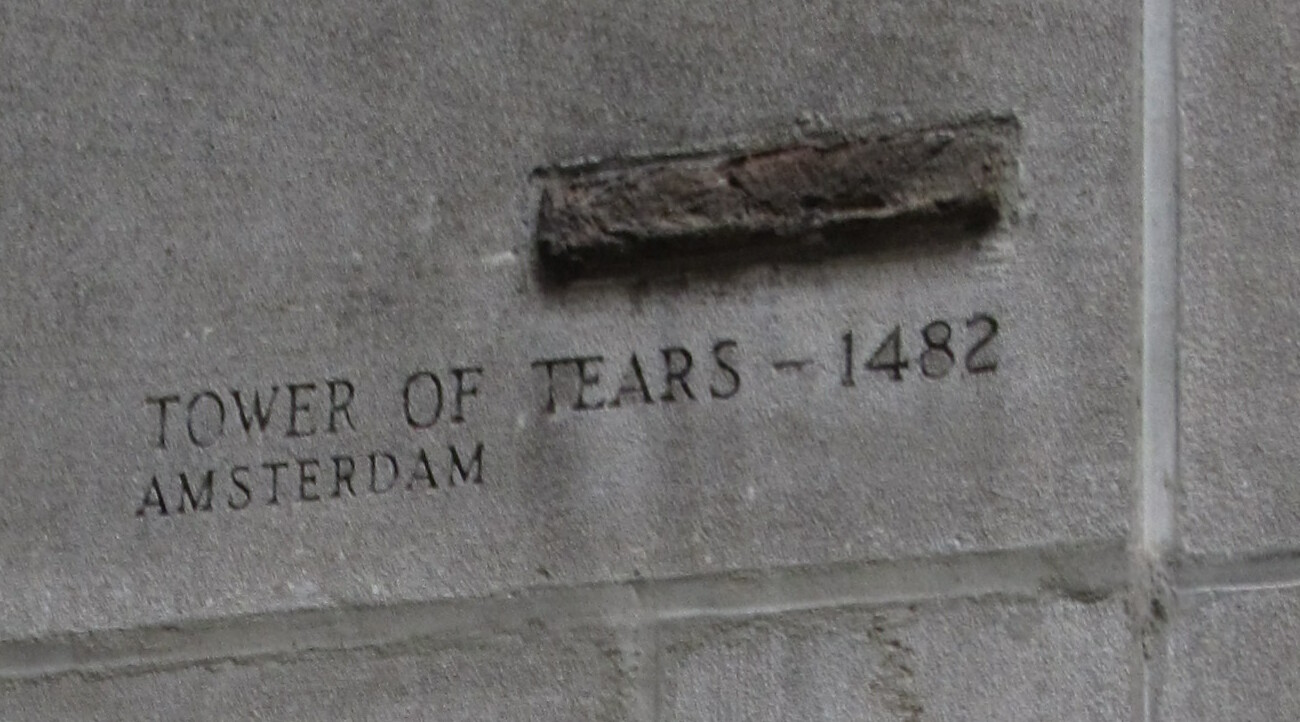
A brick of the Schreierstoren embedded in the Tribune Tower in Chicago, U.S.
